= Virginie Mécène =

Modern dancer and modern dance educator

- Born: Sucy-en-Brie, France
- Education: Free Dance Song; Fédération Française de la Danse; and Licence Professionnelle in Artistic and Cultural Management, University of Bourgogne
- Occupations: Dancer, Choreographer, Instructor, and Artistic Director
- Years active: 1984-present
- Spouse: Kevin Predmore (m. 1993)
- Dancing career
- Current group: Director at the Martha Graham Center and Freelance Choreographer
- Former groups: Martha Graham Dance Company, Pearl Lang Dance Theater, Battery Dance Company
- Website: https://www.virginiemecene.com

Virginie Mécène is a French and American dancer, choreographer, director and educator. She was a principal dancer with the Martha Graham Dance Company from 1994 to 2006, the director of the Martha Graham School from 2007 to 2015, and is the current director of Graham 2. Mécène was a soloist with Pearl Lang Dance Theater from 1991 to 2002, and Battery Dance Company, from 1995 to 2000. She joined Buglisi Dance Theater as a principal dancer in 1994. Mécène has trained dancers in the Martha Graham Dance Company and educated dance teachers in the Graham Technique, contributing to the worldwide proliferation and approachability of the technique.

== Early life ==
Mécène was born fourteen kilometers from Paris, France in the town of Sucy en Brie. While she began studying dance as a child, Mécène also pursued a career as a graphic layout artist. Mécène worked for Christian Dior Parfum, General Graphic, Carte Blanche, and Avant-poste.

== Training ==
In 1984, Mécène decided to give up working in graphic design to pursue her dance career. She enrolled at Free Dance Song, an Afro-American Dance School founded by Christiane de Rougemont, at The Cité Universitaire de Paris. At the school, Mécène received training in African dance with Elsa Wolliaston, the Katherine Dunham Technique, the Martha Graham Technique, and Jazz with Reney Déshauteurs. She studied pedagogy with Agnes Denis and received a C.A.E. in Jazz from the Fédération Française de la Danse in 1985.

After teaching in Paris for three years, she moved to New York City in 1988 to study at the Martha Graham School. She received her Professional Training Program certificate, The Third Year Certificate, and Teaching certificate. While she was a student, Mécène danced with the Martha Graham Ensemble and took part in the reconstruction of Graham’s original works, Panorama, and "Prelude to Action" from Chronicle. Her teachers were Martha Graham, Pearl Lang, Yuriko, Sophie Maslow, Linda Hodes, Ethel Winter, Ethel Butler, Jane Duddley, Diane Gray, Takako Asakawa, Armgard van Bardeleben, and many others.

== Career ==
=== Principal dancer and soloist ===
Mécène joined the Martha Graham Dance Company in 1994. She toured internationally and performed a wide range of the Graham Repertory. She performed principal roles in many works, including "The Lament" in Acts of Light; The Woman in Red and The Woman in Yellow in Diversion of Angels; the lead in Heretic; the lead in Maple Leaf Rag; The Maiden in Seraphic Dialogue; The Bride in Appalachian Spring; The Pussycat in The Owl; and The Pussycat, Circe, and Eve in Embattled Garden; Mary as Magdalene in El Penitente; and the solo Deep Song. While in the Graham Company, she originated a role in Susan Stroman’s But Not For Me, and performed Lucinda Child’s Histoire.

Concurrently, Mécène was a principal dancer and founding member of Buglisi Dance Theater (formerly Buglisi/Foreman Dance). She performed with other founding members: Terese Capucilli, Christine Dakin, Donlin Foreman, Jacqulyn Buglisi, and Kevin Predmore. She originated new works by Jacqulyn Buglisi and Donlin Foreman, including Suspended Women, Requiem, Blue Cathedral, and Dances for Seven.

Along with her husband and long-time dance partner, Kevin Predmore, Mécène presented full evenings of solos and duets at The Danny Kaye Playhouse, in New York City, and in churches in Kobe and Hiroshima, Japan.

=== Director and educator ===
In August 2006, Mécène left the Graham Company and, in January 2007, became the Director of the Martha Graham School and the Artistic Director of Graham 2, Martha Graham’s second Company. She led the yearlong certificate pedagogy program and the Teacher Training program and created the Intensive Teacher Workshop, educating teachers of all backgrounds, contributing to the approachability and proliferation of the Graham Technique worldwide.

Mécène has lectured, re-staged, reconstructed, and directed many of Martha Graham's works, including Steps in the Street, Chronicle, Panorama, and Appalachian Spring. She has worked with Universities and dance companies at the University of Washington in Seattle, Washington; the University of the Arts and Temple University, in Philadelphia, Pennsylvania; Utah Valley University, Brigham Young University, and the Repertory Dance Theater, in Utah; Harvard University Dance Group, in Cambridge, Massachusetts; and Les Ballets de Lorraine in Nancy, France. Mécène has also taught the Graham Technique at national and international conferences held at Barnard College, Ailey School, Peridance Capezio Center, and Fieldstone High School in New York City; Skidmore College in Saratoga Springs, New York; Le Centre National de la Danse and Studio Harmonic in Paris, France; L’Opéra-Theatre in Metz, France; and Singapore Dance Ensemble, in Singapore.

=== Choreography ===
Mécène choreographed and reimagined the concept of Martha Graham’s lost solo, Ekstasis, for the Martha Graham Dance Company. Gia Kourlas from the New York Times called it “eerie yet poignantly forthright." Mécène’s version of Ekstasis premiered in 2017 at the Joyce Theater in New York City. Since its premiere, it has toured in many countries including in Paris, France at the Palais Garnier, where it was performed by Étoile and Director of Paris Opéra Ballet, Aurélie Dupont. Mécène has also coached New York City Ballet principal dancer Sara Mearns in Ekstasis for special Galas at City Center and Jacob's Pillow.

She choreographed a number of works in diverse styles and received several commissions in the U.S. and abroad including: UNUM, for the Buglisi Dance Theater; Homenaje a Martha Graham, a full-length work consisting of ten solos for NEU records with music by Ramón Humet; A New Place, a work commissioned by the Martha Graham Dance Company set to the music of Thomas Hormel’s original score, The Legend of Bird Mountain. In 2018, the premiere performance was performed by Graham 2 in the Martha Graham Dance Company's program in Florida with live music by the South Florida Symphony Orchestra.

Her work has been presented at venues such as the Palais Garnier, in Paris, France; New York City Center, the Joyce Theater, Teresa Lang Theater, and the Ailey Citigroup Theater, in New York City; Kaatsban International Dance Center, in Tivoli, New York; the Adrienne Arhst Center, in Miami, Florida; the Broward Center, in Fort-Lauderdale, Florida; and at L’Auditori de Barcelona, in Barcelona, Spain.

Mécène also worked with nonprofit vildwerk., which aims to increase environmental conservation awareness through dance, as a featured choreographer for Floes, scored by Judith Shatin and performed by Grace Sautter. The performance was part of vildwerk.'s 2025 program, Dancing For Our Wonderful World.

=== Other work ===
Mécène served as a Lecturer at Barnard College in 2004. She was the president of the Emergency Fund For Student Dancers.

== Personal life ==
Mécène married her dance partner, Kevin Predmore, in 1993.

== Awards ==
- Choreographer Award, New York State Council on the Arts for UNUM
- Career Award, Fini Italian International Dance Awards
