= Helen McGehee =

American dancer (1921–2020)

Helen Gray McGehee
- Born: May 10, 1921; Lynchburg, Virginia, U.S.
- Died: April 9, 2020 (aged 98); Lynchburg, Virginia, U.S.
- Other name: Helen McGehee Umaña
- Occupations: Dancer, dance educator

Helen Gray McGehee Umaña (May 10, 1921 – April 9, 2020) was an American dancer, choreographer, and dance educator associated with Martha Graham and the Juilliard School.

== Early life and education ==
McGehee was born in Lynchburg, Virginia, the daughter of William Gibson McGehee and Helen Gray Mahood McGehee. Her mother was an artist and her father was in manufacturing. She graduated from E. C. Glass High School in 1938, and from Randolph-Macon Woman's College in 1942. At Randolph-Macon, she majored in Latin and Greek, but also won first prize in German Club, for a map she made. She was a member of Phi Beta Kappa. She took a dance class with Martha Graham in the summer of 1941, and was head of the modern dance troupe at Randolph-Macon.

== Career ==
After college, McGehee moved to New York City to join the Martha Graham Dance Company. She toured as a dancer in Europe, Asia, and the Middle East, and starred in the company's productions of Clytemnestra (as Electra), Deaths and Entrances, Appalachian Spring, Every Soul is a Circus, Dark Meadow, Acrobats of God, Phaedra, Archaic Hours, Judith, Errand into the Maze, Diversion of Angels , Night Journey, Canticle for Innocent Comedians, and Cave of the Heart. She also designed costumes for Clytemnestra (1958), and One Gaudy Night (1961). She was described by Clive Barnes as "intense as a flickering flame" in a 1968 review.

From 1951 to 1982, McGehee taught in the dance program at the Juilliard School. A Juilliard she staged dance programs including I Am the Gate, El Retablo de Maese Pedro, and Changes. She choreographed After Possession, Yarn, Suspended Path, Ceremonies of Remembrance, and a production of The Oresteia starring Judith Anderson. She also taught at Harvard Summer Dance Center. She appeared in several performances in Greece in 1965. In 1976 she was a guest artist-in-residence at Florida State University.

In 1971 McGehee founded a visiting artists' program at Randolph-Macon. In 2008, she organized an exhibit at the Virginia Historical Society, A Creative Dynasty: Four Generations of Virginia Women, featuring works by herself, her mother, her grandmother Sallie Lee Blount Mahood, and her great-grandmother Julia Anne Morrison Blount, all artists.

== Publications ==
- Helen McGehee: Dancer
- To Be a Dancer (1974, documentary film, made by her husband)
- "Working for Martha Graham" (1985)
- "The Technique of Martha Graham" (1993)

== Personal life ==
McGehee married Colombian artist Rafael Alfonso Umaña Mendez in 1950. They lived in Paris and New York City, before retiring to Lynchburg together in 1978. Her husband died in 1994, and she died in April 2020, at the age of 98, in Lynchburg.
