= American Lyric =

American Lyric was a modern dance work choreographed by Martha Graham to music of Alex North with costumes by Edythe Gilfond. The piece premiered on December 26, 1937, at the Guild Theatre in New York City. The ballet was subtitled Dance of Assembly. In some programs, the work also included the statement, "This dance has as its theme the basic American right—freedom of assembly."

Graham choreographed the piece for soloist (herself) and ensemble. The original group consisted of Anita Alvarez, Thelma Babitz, Ethel Butler, Jane Dudley, Nelle Fisher, Nina Fonaroff, Natalie Harris, Marie Marchowsky, Sophie Maslow and Marjorie Mazia. Although the dance did not remain in Graham Company repertory, American Lyric is noted as an important milestone in the career of the composer. At the time, Alex North became very friendly with Graham and her musical director, the composer Louis Horst.

The dance was hailed for its anti-war, anti-Fascist theme, however, the choreography reportedly did not reflect this facet of the ballet. Left-wing critic Blanche Evan saw "no substantive difference in Graham's relation to social realities." In an article for The New Masses titled Her Chosen Theme, Evan wrote, "This dance has as its theme the basic American right - freedom of assembly - so reads the program note. But again, the movement symbols employed in the dance are not symbols expressive of the theme. They are movements from the composer's predetermined category of pure 'kinesthetic,' detached and abstract and intellectually unsatisfied."

Today, American Lyric is categorized as part of Graham's Americana period, a phase that includes American Document (1938), American Provincials (1934), Frontier (1935), Panorama (1935), Horizons (1936), El Penitente (1940), Letter to the World (1940), Salem Shore (1943) and Appalachian Spring (1944). The ballet meshes with Graham's stated goal to create a "uniquely American" dance form, to help "bring forth an art as powerful as the country itself."
