= Opening Dance =

Opening Dance was a modern dance solo choreographed by Martha Graham to music by Norman Lloyd. It premiered on July 30, 1937, at the Bennington School of the Dance in Bennington, Vermont.

The work was danced by Graham herself, as were all the pieces on the all-solo program. The performance preceded the foundation of the Martha Graham Dance Company. Other pieces on the program were: Lamentation, Frontier, Satyric Festival Song, Immediate Tragedy, Spectre 1914, Act of Piety, Imperial Gesture, Eksatsis and Harlequinade.

As with much of Graham's early work, the choreography and other details of the piece are lost. Critic John Martin, writing for The New York Times, reported that the work "belongs in that most thankless category of the recital dancer, something to raise the curtain with."
