= Course (ballet) =

1935 dance work

Course was a modern dance work choreographed by Martha Graham to music by George Antheil. The piece sometimes appeared on programs as Course: One in Red; Three in Green; Two in Blue; Two in Red. It premiered on February 10, 1935, at the Guild Theatre in New York City. The ballet was performed by Martha Graham and Group, the forerunner to the Martha Graham Dance Company.

== About Martha Graham ==
Martha Graham was an American dancer and choreographer who became an influential figure in modern dance. She was born on May 11, 1894, in Pittsburgh and later moved with her family to Los Angeles. Graham did not begin studying dance until she was in her late teens, but she quickly became dedicated to the art form. She studied at the Denishawn School of Dancing and Related Arts, where she trained under Ruth St. Denis and Ted Shawn. After leaving Denishawn, Graham began developing her own style of dance that focused on expressing deep emotions and human experiences. She is also known as the "Mother of Modern Dance" for pioneering a new, highly expressive, and codified technique characterized by "contraction and release," grounded, angular movements, and intense emotional expression. Her style often focused on the torso, using breathing and spiraling to convey raw, primal human emotion, breaking away from classical ballet's lighter, gravity-defying form.She later founded the Martha Graham Dance Company in 1926, which became an important modern dance company.

== Structure and cast ==
In the debut performance, Graham appeared in the solo One in Red. Bonnie Bird, Lil Liandre and May O'Donnell performed Three in Green. Sophie Maslow and Dorothy Bird danced Two in Blue; Anna Sokolow and Lily Melman, Two in Red. Unlike much of Graham's oeuvre, Course was upbeat and full of youthful vitality.

The critic Henry Gilfond described the choreography in his review for The Dance Observer. "Miss Graham (One in Red) set the tempo of the composition in a running, light prelude introducing the first impulsive rush of the Group across the stage - lifting, elemental, striding vigor." Three in Green "took up the hurried pace in a grouping of spreading leaps and runs. A second rush across the stage was prelude to the andante Two in Blue,...and the third sweep set a frame for Two in Red,...a closer, tighter movement to maintain the pace for the last thrust of the Group, a repetition of the three segment themes, and the final sustained circular current that moved everything before it in the climax of an urgent, overwhelming statement."

== Critical reception ==
The Dance Observer's reviewer called the work the "most thoroughly human composition Martha Graham has yet presented." He continued, "The Group worked admirably. The young dancers caught the spirit and moved with it in the slow phrases as well as the more exciting, swifter movements, never more sure, more positive...Of Course it may be said, nothing was more evident than a buoyant optimism in youth, on the rebirth of all that is strong and urgent, racing through the course which is all living."

A year after the premier, The New York Times critic wrote it "has somewhat never recaptured the tremendous lift and excitement of its first performance."

== Background notes ==
Bonnie Bird, who appeared in the initial performance, told her biographer that the night before Course's debut had been filled with anxiety for the company. Graham's musical director Louis Horst received the score late on the evening before the premiere and worked much of the following day rewriting orchestration. The dancers were up until early morning hours fitting new costumes to replace an earlier set Graham had discarded. The morning of the performance they arrived at the theater for lighting rehearsals and more sewing. Bird described Graham as "sick with worry" the dance would be "a complete fiasco."

The house was sold out long before curtain time, a first for the Graham troupe, and filled with notables from New York's theater world. Audience members included Katherine Cornell, Brian Aherne, Noël Coward, George Balanchine, Lincoln Kirstein, Doris Humphrey, Charles Weidman and Sally Rand.

Some Graham scholars see Diversion of Angels, created 13 years later, as a sister dance to Course.
