= Chronicle (ballet) =

Chronicle is a modern dance work choreographed by Martha Graham to music by Wallingford Riegger. It premiered on December 20, 1936, at the Guild Theatre in New York City. The set was designed by Isamu Noguchi. Riegger's music was scored for piano, wind instruments and percussion; Noguchi's set was made up primarily of curtains, platforms and stairs. The original production was danced by Martha Graham and Group, the forerunner of the Martha Graham Dance Company. According to the program notes, the dance is based upon "the advent and consequences of war" and concerned itself with the "contemporary situation", referring to the impending conflict in Europe.

== Synopsis ==
Chronicle is more than an hour in length and chronicles the time frame from 1914 to 1936. It is divided into three major sections: Dances Before Catastrophe, which includes Spectre-1914 and Masque; Dances After Catastrophe, which includes Steps in the Street and Tragic Holiday-In Memoriam; and a final section Prelude to Action. Each section has been performed as an independent work. Steps in the Street was recreated in 1988. It is part of the current Martha Graham Dance Company repertoire.

The opening solo Spectre-1914 is a prelude to the action that follows. The dancer moves with stiff, robotic gestures in response to off-stage drums and trumpet, an embodiment, perhaps, of the inevitability of marching off to war. In the subsequent section Masque, a soloist costumed in metallic gray holds forth to an audience of followers in a formal, "court-like" display.

Steps in the Street, a long ensemble piece, suggests a mass of unwanted individuals, such as a group of the unemployed or homeless. The dancers shuffle dejectedly, occasionally rallying to execute rebellious gestures, and then return to their resigned trudging. Carrying a black flag, the soloist then leads the ensemble in a service of commemoration (Tragic Holiday-In Memoriam). The finale Prelude to Action depicts a call for "a brave new world".

== Original cast ==
At the time, Graham's all-female troupe consisted of Anita Alvarez, Thelma Babbitz, Bonnie Bird, Dorothy Bird, Ethel Butler, Aza Ceskin, Jane Dudley, Frieda Flier, Marie Marchowsky, Sophie Maslow, Marjorie Mazia, May O'Donnell, Kathleen Slagle, Gertrude Schurr, Anna Sokolow and Mildred Wile.

== Critical reception ==
Following the premiere, The New York Herald critic described Chronicle as superior to Panorama, "Miss Graham's previous attempt at an extended choreographic work with historical and sociological implications" and pointed "the way to brilliant future accomplishments" but did not fully succeed. "Many of the ideas are expressed at too great a length, and the suite, which requires about one and a quarter hours in the unfolding, would profit greatly by radical pruning." From the "aspects of design and motion," however, "Miss Graham and her group accomplish much that is remarkable. Considered merely as controlled, directed energy their efforts were amazing."

Graham reworked the ballet extensively between the first and second performances. The New York Times reviewer John Martin wrote that Graham "not only made revisions in its choreography and costuming, but actually managed to alter its general direction and manner of functioning." Where the original dance was well made, Martin noted, it "projected no passion, irradiated no warmth." In its "second incarnation" the critic described the opening solo as "ominous and gripping", Dances After Catastrophe as having "great power" and containing "under their surface of defeat and suffering the most eloquent indications of protest and rebellion."

Of the revised version Dance Observer's reporter wrote, "It is an ambitious undertaking, a composition on a grand scale, making enormous demands on both the soloist and her group," while the critic for The Christian Science Monitor noted, "I found it deeply moving…and only seldom disappointing...The technical performance of this work, by both Miss Graham and the group, leaves you gasping." The critic for The New York Sun compared Chronicle to Kurt Jooss' famous anti-war ballet The Green Table.

The set and score were also praised. The set for its simplicity. The "plangent, percussive" score for its "composition, understanding of the text" and "excellent foreshadowing of the choreography."

== Steps in the Street ==
In 1988, the Graham company recreated Chronicle's middle section Steps in the Street. Subtitled Devastation - Homelessness - Exile, the dance is a portrait of the human condition born out of the Great Depression and of Graham's response to the Spanish Civil War. It references the plight of individuals suffering through hunger, poverty. and civil and labor unrest and presents a nihilistic view of war's destructiveness and isolating effects. Although the work does not employ sets, the sculptural lighting design enhances the geometric choreography. The twelve dancers' movements are stark, angular and percussive. They dance in groups, but never really together.

Reviews of the re-staged work were positive. The New York Times dance critic wrote, "Why do early Graham works that have recently been revived look so fresh? Steps, which is obviously a fragment but a major fragment, provides the answer. Its form is completely abstract: the choreography is focused on one woman...who was constantly bypassed by lines of 12 other women in black..." She also noted that although the piece was made during a specific historical era, it has broader implications. "Miss Graham was dealing here with the aftermath of war but also with the loneliness that can well up in everyone, especially those alienated from society."

The New York Post dance critic agreed. "Seemingly picking up contrapuntal elements in Riegger’s score, the choreography conveys the desperation of the masses, the pain of isolation, the loneliness of despair."

== Filmography ==
- Martha Graham Dance Company: We Are Our Time (2 episodes) (PBS, 2026) - a performance of "Spectre-1914" is featured in Episode 2
