= Salutation (ballet) =

Salutation was a modern dance solo choreographed by Martha Graham to music by Lehman Engel. It premiered on April 7, 1936, at Philharmonic Auditorium in Los Angeles, California. Subtitled Dance of Greeting, the work was performed by the choreographer.

Graham performed ten other pieces on the all-solo program: Lamentation, Frontier, Satyric Festival Song, Building Motif from Horizons, Imperial Gesture, Sarabande, Act of Piety, Ekstasie, Frenetic Rhythm (No.3) and Harlequinade.

Salutation-Dance of Greeting did not remain in the Martha Graham Dance Company repertory. The choreography and other details of the piece are lost. Graham also created other dances with the same name, including a 1930 work set to music by Arthur Honegger (originally called Prelude to a Dance) and a 1932 piece with music by Carlos Chávez (originally called Prelude).
