= Bacchanale (ballet) =

Bacchanale was an ensemble work created by Martha Graham to music by Wallingford Riegger. It premiered on February 2, 1931, at the Craig Theatre in New York City. The work was danced by Martha Graham and Group, the forerunner of the Martha Graham Dance Company.

Troupe members, all female, were Lillian Shapiro, Mary Rivoire, Dorothy Bird, Sydney Brenner, Louise Creston, Ailes Gilmour, Mattie Haim, Lily Mehlman, Sophie Maslow, Pauline Nelson, May O'Donnell, Lillian Ray, Ethel Rudy, Gertrude Shurr, Anna Sokolov and Joan Woodruff. The work was also known as Bacchanale No. 2., and was presented with that title beginning June 2, 1932, at a performance in Ann Arbor, Michigan.

Information on much of Graham's work from the 1920s and 1930s, including Bacchanale, has been lost. Writing generally about her work of the period, Stark Young of The New Republic noted, "Her dancing is pictorial necessarily, since one understands it through the eyes. It is not pictorial in the sense of being representative, but pictorial as is an abstract painting, or a pattern in design."

The composer, Riegger, referring to Graham's practice at the time of creating her dances and then working with composers to fit music to the steps, commented on the process of writing the music for Bacchanale: “When I arrived at her studio I found to my surprise her dance group assembled and ready to perform for me the already completed dance….I became party to nearly the first attempt at writing music to a dance already composed.”
