= Dolorosa (ballet) =

Dolorosa is a modern dance solo choreographed by Martha Graham to music by Heitor Villa-Lobos. The work premiered on February 2, 1931, at New York's Craig Theatre. Dolorosa sometimes appeared in program notes with the subtitle from Primitive Cycle or from Primitive Cycle-Dance of Sorrow II.

The ballet is one of a group of dances inspired by Graham's visits to New Mexico. Her fascination with Native American religious rituals was also explored in El Penitente, Incantation, and Primitive Mysteries. Some sources suggest Dolorosa is based on the theme of the Mater Dolorosa, familiar subject matter for the choreographer. Little else is known about the piece. Graham disliked revivals of her work, forbade notation of her dances and thought they could not be successfully filmed.
