= Clytemnestra (dance) =

Ballet choreographed by Martha Graham

Clytemnestra is a 90-minute ballet choreographed by Martha Graham. It premiered on April 1, 1958, at the Adelphi Theatre in New York with music composed by Halim El-Dabh and sets designed by Isamu Noguchi. Following Cave of the Heart, Errand into the Maze, and Night Journey, Clytemnestra continued Graham's series of choreography inspired by Greek mythology.

== Development ==
In the late 1950s, after being acquainted with Eugene Lester, the composer and arranger for Martha Graham, at a party, Halim El-Dabh was invited to Graham's studio. Graham commissioned a 15-minute music piece after being impressed by his music. However, the music was not used after he sensed a hesitation from Graham. The music was then recomposed and developed into the music used for the ballet.

== Theme ==
Clytemnestra was inspired by Aeschylus' Oresteia and tells of the events that precede Clytemnestra's choice to murder her husband, Agamemnon, upon his return home from the Trojan War. In keeping with her other myth-inspired choreographies, Graham centers the female perspective in this dance. And while primarily focusing on Clytemnestra and the past experiences that drove her to commit murder, the dance also includes the tragic stories of other mythical women such as Helen, Electra, and Cassandra.

== Set ==
Noguchi's set for Clytemnestra creates four main sites across the stage: a white throne on the left, gate-like stones on the right, golden ropes that hang in the middle, and Clytemnestra's bed which is added in the third act. Significant props for the piece include two spears that form an X shape and a red cloth that Clytemnestra carries. The spears move throughout the dance to mark the death places of both Agamemnon and Iphigenia. The red cloth doubles as both a wing-like garment for Clytemnestra and a red carpet for Agamemnon upon his return home.
