= American Document =

American Document is a modern dance work choreographed by Martha Graham in response to rising Fascism in 1930s Europe. The piece premiered on August 6, 1938 at the Vermont State Armory in Bennington, Vermont. The ballet features spoken word excerpts from the Declaration of Independence and Emancipation Proclamation, among other texts. The set was created by Arch Lauterer; the costumes were designed by Edythe Gilfond. The original music was written by Ray Green. Graham extensively reworked the choreography in 1989. John Corigliano's Oboe Concerto replaced Green's music for the revised version.

== Theme and characters ==
The idea for the ballet came to Graham as she listened to the Axis nations' "vicious and terrifying" propaganda on the radio. It occurred to her that American democracy had a repository of words with "the power to hearten men and move them to action."

The original program notes state," Our documents are our legends - our poignantly near history - our folk tales." The notes also include the quotations from historical documents and figures that are spoken throughout the performance. The text is excerpted from The Declaration of Independence, Song of Songs, Lincoln's Gettysburg Address and Second Inaugural Address, the Emancipation Proclamation and the writings, speeches or sermons of Jonathan Edwards, Thomas Paine, John Wise, Francis Fergusson and Red Jacket, the Seneca orator.

Both set and costumes subtly used a red, white and blue motif.

The ballet is patterned after a minstrel show, although Graham was careful to avoid degrading racial stereotypes. Green's original music was scored for piano and drums. It borrowed from American and African folk tunes and incorporated the fanfares and drum rolls characteristic of minstrel shows. The characters and structure are also derived from minstrelsy.

The roles are:

- The Actor as Interlocutor
- The End Figures
- The Chorus - a dance group and leader
- Two Principals

The Interlocutor introduces the show and addresses the audience directly, reading excerpts from the chosen documents. Although unnamed, the End Figures are the equivalent of Mr. Tambo and Mr. Bones, minstrel show characters who traditionally interact with the Interlocutor in "Cross-Fire." The chorus also is a feature of the theatrical form.

At the first performance, Graham and Erick Hawkins danced the roles of Two Principals, May O'Donnell and Jane Dudley played the End Figures, and Sophie Maslow led the chorus. Actor Houseley Stevens, Jr. appeared in the role of Interlocutor.

== Structure ==
The action takes place in six sequences, an entrance and five "episodes:"

- Entrance: Walk Around; Cross-Fire
- First Episode: Declaration
- Second Episode: Occupation
- Third Episode: The Puritan
- Fourth Episode: Emancipation
- Fifth Episode: The After Piece-Cross Fire-Cakewalk (1938), renamed Hold Your Hold! (1942)

=== Entrance ===
In the opening scene, the company struts and cakewalks, a dance also known as the walk-around. They bow to one other and to the audience, gathering in a semi-circle at the rear of the stage in conventional minstrel show fashion. Once all of the performers are present, the Interlocutor introduces the action. "Ladies and Gentlemen, good evening. This is a theater. The place is here in the United States of America. The time is now-tonight."

Each of the subsequent episodes is introduced by the Interlocutor; each concludes with a walk-around that ends in an empty stage.

=== Declaration ===
The first episode begins with the Interlocutor asking, "An American-What is an American?" The End Figures enter, running diagonally across the stage accompanied by a drum roll. They cross three times, then stop as the Interlocutor recites from the Declaration of Independence. As he speaks, the chorus members enter singly, slowly walking to positions in a line downstage. After a Dance of Declaration, featuring the chorus leader and male principal, all performers leave the stage.

=== Occupation ===
The second episode celebrates the country's Native American heritage. As the Interlocutor crosses from stage right to left, he asks, "America-What is America?" The sequence features a solemn solo, Native Figure, for the female principal accompanied by texts from Fergusson and Graham. An all-female ensemble then performs Lament to the Land with spoken words excerpted from a letter by Red Jacket mourning the native peoples' loss of country.

=== The Puritan ===
The scene's narration begins in similar fashion to the first episode with the Interlocutor querying, "An American-What is an American?" The focus of the sequence is a duet for the principals, ostensibly meant to show the conflict between the Puritan wish to lead "a simple life or an angry life of denial." While the narration weaves the sensual Song of Songs with a fiery sermon from Puritan pastor Jonathan Edwards, the choreography tells a tale of unrepressed passion.

=== Emancipation ===
The fourth episode begins as a dance for the entire ensemble and concludes in a duet for the principals. The section begins with the Interlocutor onstage alone, "The United States of America-What is it?" The spoken word excerpts are taken from the Emancipation Proclamation, the Gettysburg Address, and Graham's own writings. As described in the program notes, the ensemble dance and duet are "ecstatic." The company ends the episode with outstretched arms and upturned faces.

=== Hold Your Hold! ===
The fifth episode, originally named the After Piece, later renamed Hold Your Hold!, brings the audience up to the present day. From 1938 through 1944, the Interlocutor introduced the piece by proclaiming the current year. Three women, speaking as "three million women" intone a "lament for the living." One man, a surrogate for "one million men," voices his hopes and fears. A Dance of Invocation brings the performance to a climax as the Interlocutor speaks, "America! Name me the word that is courage. America! Name me the word that is justice. America! Name me the word that is power. America! Name me the word that is freedom. America! Name me the word that is faith. Here is that word - Democracy!" The company exits with the exception of the Principals, who stand on opposite sides of the stage as the Interlocutor recites the famous words from Lincoln's Gettysburg Address "That government of the people, by the people, and for the people shall not perish from the earth." The company enters in a final walk-around. The Interlocutor bids the audience goodnight.

== Post-premiere changes ==
Graham frequently altered her work after their initial debuts. She modified the choreography of American Document from 1938 through 1944, years in which the country had also seen many changes. Bits of text were also added or deleted, although it is not clear in exactly what ways.

=== 1989 Version ===
Graham overhauled American Document in 1989 with almost all new choreography, revised narration and minimization of the minstrel show aspect. The world premiere of the work featured two guest artists, Mikhail Baryshnikov, as the male principal, and Cecilia Peck, as the Interlocutor. Baryshnikov danced the Native Figure solo, a dance Graham made for herself, in the Occupation episode. The new American Document also included men in the previously all-female chorus. New narrative passages included quotes from Martin Luther King Jr. and John F. Kennedy.

=== 2010 Version ===
In 2010, director Anne Bogart and playwright Charles L. Mee reinvented American Document for 21st century audiences. Though not one of Martha Graham's dances, the work is closely tied to the original and poses the same question, "What is an American?" Bogart and Mee's American Document was staged for six SITI Company actors and ten Graham dancers. The dance/theater piece incorporated text from such sources as the free verse of Walt Whitman, the spontaneous prose of Jack Kerouac and the blog posts of American soldiers stationed in Iraq.

== Critical reception ==
Following the premiere and Carnegie Hall performance that occurred shortly after, American Document was called "a moving testimonial to the greatest of American traditions-democracy." Another critic gushed, "If there is any American who can witness Martha Graham's new dance composition American Document without emerging from the experience a finer prouder citizen, that person is impervious to reason, numb to emotion, insensible to art." Some notices were more nuanced, praising the work for its honesty in pointing out the bad as well as the good in the American experience.

Reviewers noted the premiere marked the first appearance of a male dancer with the Graham company. Erick Hawkins performed courtesy of Ballet Caravan, a precursor of the New York City Ballet. Critics praised the inclusion of Hawkins and favorably reviewed his efforts, although many noted he came from a ballet tradition rather than one of modern dance. His duets with Graham were especially well received.

From its 1938 debut through 1944, as Graham made changes to the ballet, the notices became less complimentary. New York Herald Tribune critic Edwin Denby pronounced a 1944 version "a complete failure," adding that the work originally seemed to show America's history "as much for its disgraces as for its strengths. At present it seems intended merely as a smug glorification."

American Document is now recognized as one of the most important works of Graham's Americana period, a phase that includes American Provincials (1934), Frontier (1935), Panorama (1935), Horizons (1936), El Penitente (1940), Letter to the World (1940), Salem Shore (1943) and Appalachian Spring (1944).

=== 1989 Reviews ===
Reviews of the 1989 version, for the most part, were not favorable. The dance was called "disassociated", "pretentious" "gibberish" in which the words did not illuminate the choreography and vice versa. One critic with a more positive impression described the piece as "an extreme distillation of her original distillation" that maintained the integrity of her subject matter, "an affirmation of belief in freedom and democracy."

=== 2010 Reviews ===
Critics noted the American Document of 2010 was more provocative than the original, demanding "what it means to be American in an age of foreign wars that kill innocent people, government-sponsored torture, immigrant bashing and the ongoing challenge posed by feminism."
