= Deep Song (ballet) =

Solo modern dance by Martha Graham

Deep Song, a solo modern dance by Martha Graham, premiered on December 19, 1937, at the Guild Theatre in New York City. Performed to music by Henry Cowell, the piece was the second work created by Graham in response to the Spanish Civil War. The first, Immediate Tragedy, was introduced in 1937.

== Theme, score, set and costume ==
According to program notes, Deep Song was "not meant to be an exact picture of a Spanish woman but presents the torture of mind and body experienced in common by all people who react to such suffering as the Spanish people have faced."

When Cowell was composing the music for Immediate Tragedy, Graham requested another movement, which he called Cante Hondo, Spanish for "deep song". In Flamenco music, deep songs (cante jondo) are the most serious of the vocal form. Sometimes, Graham used both compositions for Immediate Tragedy; other times, she used only the original sarabande. Deep Song was choreographed to Cante Hondo on its own.

The music for both ballets was lost for decades. Cante Hondo was discovered in 2003 behind a desk at the Martha Graham Dance Company's offices. The score for Immediate Tragedy has never been found.

Graham designed both the set and costume for Deep Song. The set consisted of a single long low wooden bench, similar to the one constructed for Lamentation. It suggested both a coffin and mourners' pew, and served as an axis for the soloist's motions.

The costume alluded to Pablo Picasso's powerful mural Guernica, painted in the same year Deep Song was made. As Graham danced, the lines of her body in the long striped black and white dress formed graphic strokes of white against the black velvet backdrop.

== Choreography ==
The choreography embodied the suffering of the Spanish people. "It was full of strange, strong creation, full of angular spasms, of Picasso style abstractions in plane and three-dimensional mobility, expressing as no newspaper story with a Madrid date line has done of the struggle..."

Program notes for the troupe's 2015 season described "the forms of the dance – its swirls, crawls on the floor, contractions and falls" as "kinetic experiences of the human experience in war... It is the anatomy of anguish from tragic events."

== Critical reception ==
From the outset, the solo was received favorably, although some reviewers thought the piece overwrought. The Boston Transcript's critic wrote, "the dancer seemed to be overplaying her hand, so that what began as a moving portrait ended, by overstatement, in losing some of its point."

Another reviewer, noted the dance was "exaggerated in delineation and repetitious in content but a highly effective though stylized portrayal of a tortured mind and body."

Following a Graham retrospective in 1944, The New York Times' dance critic John Martin wrote the work was not among those that "seemed to do most completely what they set out to do," but could be categorized with dances having "aspects, elements, passages of beauty and power." He referred to Deep Song in particular as an "extraordinary evocation."

== Performance history ==
Deep Song was presented fairly frequently from its premiere to the mid-1940s. In January 1938, Graham performed the solo at the New York Hippodrome in the second "Dance for Spain" benefit concert. The event may have been where she first met future husband and dance partner Erick Hawkins, who was appearing with Ballet Caravan.

During the 1980s, Graham, who disliked revivals, was persuaded to reprise some of her earlier dances. Deep Song was restaged in 1988. Graham alone had danced the solo role, but did not remember all the choreography. Martha Graham worked with principal dancer, Terese Capucilli, to recreate the work. Barbara Morgan photographs were used to bring the work back to life. Capucilli spent hours alone in the studio with the photographs on the floor in order to find the transitional material necessary for phrasing and emotional content. She would then bring these into the rehearsals with Graham to be reworked and molded. Since the original score was lost at the time, Cowell's Sinister Resonance was used in its place.

Since its reconstruction, Terese Capucilli, Christine Dakin, Joyce Herring, Alessandra Prosperi, Miki Orihara and then Xin Ying, Blakeley White McGuire, Carrie Ellmore-Tallitsch, have appeared in the solo role.

Deep Song is in the current Martha Graham Dance Company repertory.
