= Immediate Tragedy =

Immediate Tragedy, sometimes subtitled Dance of Dedication, was a modern dance solo choreographed by Martha Graham to the music of Henry Cowell. It premiered on July 30, 1937, at the Bennington School of the Dance in Bennington, Vermont. The piece was created in response to the Spanish Civil War and rising fascism as Francisco Franco gained control of the country.

== Theme ==
In particular, Graham was inspired by tales of La Pasionaria, real name Dolores Ibárruri, a fervent communist and champion of the Spanish Republic. At the outbreak of war in 1936, Ibárruri roused Republican forces with Emiliano Zapata's words, "It is better to die on your feet than to live on your knees." During the Battle of Madrid, she coined her own famous slogan, "¡No Pasarán!" ("They shall not pass!"), which became the doomed Republic's rallying cry.

Graham created Immediate Tragedy in recognition of all Spanish women fighting side by side with the men. She intended to make a portrait of a brave, impassioned, indomitable heroine.

Although largely disengaged from the era's politics, Graham herself had taken an anti-fascist stance when she joined labor-related causes of the Popular Front against Fascism in 1935. The following year, she refused an invitation from the Nazi Culture Ministry to dance at the Berlin Olympic Games.

== Choreography and score ==
Immediate Tragedy did not make its way into the Martha Graham Dance Company repertoire, so the choreography is lost. But, Graham dancer and teacher Dorothy Bird wrote that she was startled by "the tempestuous, abandoned movement patterns..." She observed "Martha falling to the floor, twisting this way and that, beating on the floor, rebounding up, flinging herself through space. Here was a dramatically expressed burning anger, fueled by heartbreak and grief. Martha's portrayal of this gallant, militant, fearless woman hid nothing."

Cowell's score was also unconventional. The composer wrote the music while serving time in San Quentin Prison on a morals charge. Graham sent notes outlining the ballet's mood, tempo and meter, but without specifications as to the exact length of any section. To solve this problem, Cowell devised a strategy he called "elastic form." Two basic phrases for clarinet and oboe were written in two-measure, three-measure, eight-measure, etc. versions. An eight-measure musical phrase could be fit to a dance passage of the same length. Overlaps were made where necessary. Norman Lloyd, who assisted with the score, recalled, "The process, as I remember it, took about an hour. The total effect was complete unity - as though dancer and composer had been in the closest communication."

== Critical reception ==
The piece was well received by critics. John Martin of The New York Times wrote, "Not since the eloquent and beautiful Frontier, first presented three seasons ago, has she given us anything half so fine as Immediate Tragedy." The critic further noted that the work was not tied to a single event or time frame, but was universal in its appeal. "It is a picture of fortitude, especially of a woman's fortitude; of the acceptance of a challenge with a kind of passionate self-containment. From its emotional quality one recognizes its source rather than through any external means."

Another reviewer had similar thoughts, "It is not Spain that we see in her clean impassioned movement; it is the realization that Spain's tragedy is ours, is the whole world's tragedy."

Years later, Dorothy Bird expressed surprise the work had not become as popular as Graham's solo Lamentation, a 1930 study of profound grief.
