= Night Journey (ballet) =

Night Journey is a Martha Graham ballet performed to music by William Schuman with costumes designed by Graham and a set by Isamu Noguchi. Commissioned by the Elizabeth Sprague Coolidge Foundation of the Library of Congress, the work premiered on May 3, 1947, at Cambridge High School in Boston, Massachusetts. Night Journey is the third of Graham's dances derived from Greek mythology, following Cave of the Heart and Errand into the Maze.

== Theme, synopsis and original cast ==
Graham based the 30-minute-long ballet on a fragment of Sophocles' Oedipus Rex. Original program notes explain "the action takes place in Jocasta's heart at the instant when she recognizes the ultimate terms of her destiny."

The original cast members were Graham in the role of Queen Jocasta and Erick Hawkins as King Oedipus. Mark Ryder as the blind Seer (Tiresias) was accompanied by the Daughters of the Night (Furies), a chorus of six women: Pearl Lang, Yuriko, Ethel Winter, Helen McGehee, Natanya Neumann and Joan Skinner.

The piece opens with Jocasta standing at extreme stage right illuminated in a conical spotlight. She twists slowly, holding aloft a loop of rope with which she intends to kill herself. At the first performance, a sustained note from the orchestra's horns created a mood of impending doom. But, when the sound ceased, Jocasta recoiled in horror. Hastening to her room, she collapsed on the bridal bed. The ballet was reworked shortly after its debut. In the revised version, Jocasta's suicidal thoughts are interrupted by the entrance of the Seer, followed by the Furies. After wrestling briefly with the oracle, she retreats to her bed to assess her life.

As she relives her past in flashback, she sees her husband/son as a young man. She remembers him as a triumphal young warrior, surrounded by an adoring public bearing black laurel leaves. He performs a dance of the domineering suitor, she one of acquiescence. Wrapping her in his cloak, Oedipus and Jocasta engage in what appears to be an exchange of vows. In the pas de deux that follows, Jocasta embraces Oedipus, in gestures both maternal and sexual. At the duet's culmination, the pair wrap themselves in a tangle of rope atop their marriage bed, the rope representative of umbilical cord as well as the tie that binds their marriage.

The pair is interrupted by the Seer, who breaks their bond, symbolically and literally, with his staff. Jocasta then recalls the Seer's revelation of her true relationship with Oedipus. Forced to drop the rope connecting them, the couple performs a dance of realization and shame. In the original production, Oedipus hoisted and rotated a painted plywood eye, blue on one side, bloodied on the other, as a portent of his fate. The prop was later eliminated as redundant. The desolate king removes the brooch fastening Jocasta's cloak, gouging out his eyes and groping his way offstage. The queen removes her cloak, the symbol of her sovereignty, winds the rope around her neck and falls lifeless to the floor.

== Set and score ==
Noguchi's gray and white set is more elaborate than most he produced for Graham. A series of hourglass- and lyre-shaped stools, of increasing height, are placed diagonally from upstage left to right center stage. An offset stool/pillar serves as the throne where Oedipus makes Jocasta his queen. Inspired by the contours of the female pelvis, Jocasta's angled, raised rectangular bed resembles a stack of enlarged human bones. In some versions of the ballet, an oval-shaped wheel (of Fate) is located upstage right. The ominous artifacts and abstract elements combine to create a mood of impending doom.

Schuman’s harsh, dissonant, dramatic music reflects Jocasta's state of mind, underscoring the ballet's eroticism and expected unhappy ending. Strings and wind instruments dominate the work, for the most part strident, sweeping or shrill, with occasional percussive passages. While still maintaining an undercurrent of doom, the music softens when Jocasta recalls Oedipus as her lover.

== Choreography ==
Each of the three central characters dance with a distinctive set of movements. Costumed in a mask with covered eyes and a weighted cloak, the Seer moves with an air of power and purpose. He carries a heavy wooden staff that he strikes noisily on the stage and bed, emphasizing the seriousness of his message. Tiresias "sees most and least, takes up huge amounts of space when moving or standing still, yet never becomes personally engaged in the tragedy."

Holding his torso rigid, Oedipus struts and stamps, in a display of strength, the phallic thrusting of various limbs a gesture of his masculinity. At moments he lunges atop Jocasta. With a flexed foot, he pins her to the bed and throws a leg across her chest. Jocasta's dancing is the least self-assured. She darts and wanders indecisively, frequently slumping to the ground by means of back bends and back hinges. She opens her knees to Oedipus in invitation, only to later close them, drawing an arm across her pelvis in a gesture of shame or remembered sexual pleasure.

In her autobiography Blood Memory, the choreographer provides insight into a specific recurring gesture in the work. "Now Jocasta kneels on the floor at the foot of the bed and then she rises with her leg close to her breast and to her head, and her foot beyond her head, her body open in a deep contraction. I call this the vaginal cry ... It is either the cry for her lover, her husband, or the cry for her children."

The chorus is an extension of Jocasta, "the memories of things we dread to remember, things we wish to forget - the terrors." They anticipate events before they happen, frequently attempting to prevent their occurrence "always in extreme body shapes and percussive energy." The group repeatedly executes "bison jumps," a jeté leap in contraction with the legs at sharp angles and the arms held back, elbows high above the torso.

In addition to the choreography's psychosexual symbolism, a motif of seeing and not seeing runs through the dance. The Seer's eyes are covered. The chorus members hold cupped hands in front of their faces in an effort to avoid watching the unfolding tragedy. Oedipus wraps his head in his cloak, suggesting his inability to see Jocasta's true identity, and at the ballet's climax, blinds himself with the clasp from her cloak.

== Critical reception ==
The New York Herald Tribune noted, "Miss Graham has created a fine and stirring work…and her own performance as Jocasta is generally a brilliant one..." The Dance Observer's article said, "In the opening dance of tragic resignation, and in her solo bit at the end of the work, Martha Graham has invented for herself movement patterns which are among the most evocative and beautiful in her entire repertoire. So expressive in their violence, so provocative in their implication, so moving in their emotional content are these expressions of Jocasta's realization...she might easily be able to tell the entire story without benefit of the actual appearance of Oedipus, or the Seer, or the Daughters of the Night."

Schuman's score was also very well received. Critic Walter Terry wrote its patterns provided exactly what Graham's "dance style needs most — abrupt, harsh rhythms, staccato phrases that are brief and insistent, long-held steely notes against which she seems to lean and swell." Another reviewer described the score as "distinctive, ominous and foreboding, completely fitting in every respect."

Several reviewers made mention of Noguchi's set, which was far more elaborate that those he had made previously for Graham. One wrote, "Each set per se seems right, each one becomes more beautiful than its predecessor... more imposing...more attention demanding, and consequently less effective." It "could almost stand by itself in a museum, and as a sculptural exhibit tell most of the story without benefit of figures." The bed, especially, was singled out for either praise or criticism. The New York Herald Tribune's critic "particularly like the glittering yet distorted bed which focused upon and symbolized the nature of the evil tragedy which beset Jocasta and Oedipus." The New York Times reviewer John Martin found it "highly stylized...over-designed and distracting."

== Background notes ==
The making of Night Journey meshed with Graham's personal life. Dancing the role of Jocasta, and other characters she created from 1946 through 1950, became a way for her to channel the emotions of her difficult domestic relationship with Hawkins. In parallel with the Oedipus myth, Hawkins was significantly younger (15 years) than Graham. Dance critic Marcia B. Siegel wrote, "What Graham constructed for herself over the ruins of Hawkins idyll, re-imagined through dreams, myth, and an assiduously cultivated unconscious, was a series of central roles in a series of remarkable dances. The vengeful Jocasta wasn't the first but it was probably the most striking."

The work also reflects Graham's interest in Freudian and Jungian analysis. Both she and Hawkins met with Jungian psychotherapists in 1945 and 1946. Many Graham scholars remark on the fact the piece is presented from Jocasta's point of view. Not only does this make the Queen the focus of the story, it alters its content as well. "Graham makes space in this dance for something Freud forgot in his analysis of the Oedipus complex: women's sexual pleasure...what is highlighted in Night Journey is not the son's desire, but the mother's."

== Performance history ==
Night Journey has been a staple of the troupe's repertory since its premiere and is one of the few dances Graham permitted to be filmed. Pearl Lang took over the Jocasta role from Graham. In 1975, Rudolf Nureyev appeared as Oedipus. Peggy Lyman, Christine Dakin and Terese Capucilli appeared as the queen in the 1970s, 80s and 90s.

With the rest of the company repertoire, the work was not performed during the protracted Graham vs. Graham lawsuit, which raged from 1999 to 2003. When legal battles over rights to Graham's work were settled, Night Journey reentered the Martha Graham Dance Company repertory. Since then, Elizabeth Auclair, Katherine Crockett, and Blakeley White-McGuire have been among the dancers portraying Jocasta.

Night Journey was filmed for educational television by director Alexander Hammid as part of a three episode series. Graham appeared as Jocasta, Bertram Ross as Oedipus and Paul Taylor as the Seer. Helen McGehee led the chorus, which included Ethel Winter, Mary Hinkson, Linda Hodes, Akiko Kanda, Carol Payne and Bette Shaler. Graham had misgivings about having her dances filmed, but ultimately relented to producer Nathan Kroll for the making of the documentary A Dancer's World. After the short was televised in 1956, Kroll asked permission to film two of her most famous ballets, Appalachian Spring and Night Journey. They were aired in 1958 and 1960, respectively.
