= Praeludium (ballet) =

Praeludium, also called Praeludium (No. 1), was a modern dance solo choreographed by Martha Graham to music by Paul Nordoff. The piece was sometimes subtitled Dance of Greeting. It premiered on February 10, 1935, at the Guild Theatre in New York City. Graham created the original costumes. Edythe Gilfond redesigned them in 1938. In the same year Graham made Praeludium, she choreographed another solo, Formal Dance, to music by David Diamond. It was renamed Praeludium (No. 2).

Little else is known about the ballet, although a San Francisco critic described the work's theme, "Miss Graham definitely projected the American tempo and architectural spatial patterns that belong essentially to the American scene." She added that the dance "most completely accomplished her oft-stated aim," no doubt referring to Graham's goal of creating a "uniquely American" dance form."
