= Revolt (ballet) =

Revolt, initially called Danse, was a modern dance solo choreographed by Martha Graham to music by Arthur Honegger. It premiered with the original title on October 16, 1927, at the Little Theatre in New York City. By February 1928 it appeared in programs as Revolt.

Other works at the premiere were Choral; Adagio (from second Suite); Scherzo, Op. 16 No.2; Tanzstück; Deux Valses; Five Poems; Tanagra; Esquisse Antique; Lucrezia; Alt-Wein; La Cancion; Ronde; Two Poems of the East and Baal Shem. Graham performed with her small company of dancers: Evelyn Sabin, Betty MacDonald and Rosina Savelli.

The New York Herald Tribune's reviewer wrote of the debut, "Many of the numbers were new, several of them were really beautiful, most of them were interesting, and one or two significant, for example Honneger's Danse.

Although it did not advocate a particular party line, Revolt was Graham's first piece of social commentary. Biographer and longtime friend Agnes de Mille said, "She was speaking for the individual, for the outraged spirit, for her own spirit, in fact...She would not accept formulae."

Dance Magazine's critic noted, "To Honegger's mad music she was significant as a typical product of modern industry - a down trodden, agonized soul, trying in vain to free itself from the tremendous power that is crushing it to earth. This was done most effectively." The reviewer added the work "was the highlight of the whole program."
