= Frontier (ballet) =

Frontier is a solo dance choreographed by Martha Graham to music by Louis Horst. The set was designed by Isamu Noguchi; Graham created the costume. The work began as an ensemble piece, Perspectives: Frontier and Marching Song also known as Frontiers (Perspective No. 1) and Frontier. The ballet's Marching Song portion was set to music by Lehman Engle. The work premiered on April 28, 1935, at the Guild Theatre in New York City. By the end of 1935, Graham was performing Frontier exclusively as a solo. The piece was the first of her works to explore American identity through an archetypal character.

== Theme ==
Approximately seven minutes in length, Frontier is the first of Graham's "American" modern dance works, a group that includes American Document (1938), American Provincials (1934), Panorama (1935), El Penitente (1940), Letter to the World (1940), Salem Shore (1943) and Appalachian Spring (1944). In its solo form, the piece was subtitled American Perspective of the Plains.

In her autobiography, Blood Memory, Graham wrote that her family's move West by train was the inspiration for Frontier. "Tracks in front of me, how they gleamed whether we went straight ahead or through a newly carved-out mountain. It was these tracks that hugged the land, and became a part of my living memory. Parallel lines whose meaning was inexhaustible, whose purpose was infinite. This was, for me, the beginning of my ballet Frontier." The work meshes with Graham's stated goal to create a "uniquely American" dance form, to help "bring forth an art as powerful as the country itself."

== Set and costume ==
Frontier was the first of Graham's ballets to feature scenic elements. All of her previous dances had been performed on a bare stage. She commissioned sculptor Isamu Noguchi to design the spare, but evocative, set. A rough log fence, two rails supported by two upright posts, sits at center stage. Two lengths of rope are arranged in a V-shape that stretches from either wing of the stage to meet in a point behind the fence, an effect suggesting limitless perspective. It was Noguchi's first effort at creating a stage set. He would continue to design for Graham's work over the next five decades.

Graham herself designed the Frontier costume, a stylized version of a 19th century homespun dress. It consisted of a long pale pink gingham jumper with asymmetric collar over a simple, long-sleeved white blouse. The gown's color was selected to suggest optimism and freshness. An open short white loose-fitting jacket with dolman style sleeves completed the garment. Her hair was worn loose, but pulled back from her face with a strip of cloth. The overall effect of set and costume is one of a rugged pioneer woman joyously at home in "the vastness of the American landscape before it was fully tamed by the settlers."

== Score ==
Graham's mentor and musical director Louis Horst composed the ballet's score for a small ensemble: wind instruments, drum and piano. The music is essentially "a simple rendering of an American tune in rondo form." Its rhythmic patterns shift unexpectedly to support relatively short sections of thematically-related movement, but are integrated smoothly into a unified composition.

== Choreography ==
The choreography is direct and deceptively simple. The curtain opens to reveal the soloist standing and facing the audience, arms behind her grasping the fence rail. As the orchestra plays a fanfare, she rhythmically pulses up and down, and then steps side to side, lifting her free leg higher and higher. She places her left leg on the upper railing, continuing to rise and fall on the ball of her right foot. Turning her head as if to scan the horizon, she breaks into a broad smile. Frontier marked the first time Graham smiled as part of the choreography, shedding the emotionless expression worn in her previous dances. The soloist slowly leans back to recline across the fence as if to claim it and the surrounding territory as her own.

As the music transitions into a march, she disengages from the fence with an expansive circular motion. The movement now becomes a parade step, as the soloist marches up and downstage exuberantly swinging one arm as she kicks sideways with the opposite leg. Three times, the dancer advances kicking to the side. The movement alternates twice with a lunging backward kick and release step outlining a circular pattern on the stage. The dancer returns to the fence, once more aligning her body horizontally, then sinks to the floor. Now on her knees, she leans back with rigid thighs and torso in a movement known as a "hinge". This resolves into a series of splits, a wide embrace of the air and return to a standing position.

Another set of joyous sideways kick-jumps follows. At the sound of a sustained flute note and the musical hint of a solemn hymn, she straightens her body. Pressing her arms tightly to her sides, she performs a sequence of tiny steps with feet in parallel. Facing the audience, the dancer repeatedly traces a square pattern on the stage with the repetitive lateral movement. On one pass around the perimeter, she rocks an invisible infant in her arms. The ballet ends with the soloist's return to the fence, her back to the audience and face in profile. She plants her leg triumphantly on the upper rail, one arm outstretched, one upraised, in salutation to all she surveys. In a final definitive gesture, she brings her fist down to clasp a knee.

== Critical reception ==
After the premiere and subsequent performances, many reviewers were struck by the new warmth and accessibility of Graham's dancing. "Instead of static preoccupation with abstract considerations of form and medium...," wrote a Massachusetts critic, "The center of her attention has shifted so that now the dancer may be thought of as looking outward into the world where history as the component of complex human factors is to be studied." By "adding the dimension of action to the former dimensions of space and time," the quality of her dancing has "become more emotional, warmer, less classic and detached from ordinary humanity."

The Dance Observer's Lois Balcom agreed. In 1944, she wrote, "To many, Frontier seemed to mark a new direction, a warmer, more intimate spirit, a more 'understandable' Martha Graham. For its lyricism, for its evocation of shimmering space, for the novelty of its decor and the haunting quality of its music, it was loved on the first night of its presentation and has been loved through countless repetitions ever since."

The New York Times' critic John Martin wrote of a later performance, "Frontier is deeply felt and simply projected... Here, one believes, Miss Graham has touched the finest note of her career..."

The set and costume were also praised and appreciated as visual aids to understanding the work. "One wished that Miss Graham would see fit to use in her other dances of suggestive props such as those employed in Frontier, where they prove of inestimable value as stimulation to the observer's fantasy."

Frontier has been interpreted as a metaphor for the dancer/choreographer coming into her own as a mature and independent artist. In retrospect, some Graham scholars regard Frontier as a sketch for her best-known work Appalachian Spring since they are similar in theme and style.

== Performance history ==
Frontier became Graham's most popular solo and a trademark, of sorts. In 1937, Graham was invited by Eleanor Roosevelt to perform at the White House, the first dancer to receive this honor. Frontier was among the four solos she presented. Graham performed the work with great frequency until the early 1940s, and then less so.

In 1964, a film of Frontier with Ethel Winter was made at Connecticut College. The film was disavowed by Graham as inauthentic.

Frontier briefly reentered the Martha Graham Dance Company repertory in 1975, performed by both Janet Eilber and Peggy Lyman. In 1976, Eilber was filmed dancing the solo role.

The television series Great Performances: Dance in America featured the Graham and her troupe in the third episode of the first season. The troupe performed six Graham works: Frontier (Janet Eilber), Lamentation, Appalachian Spring, Diversion of Angels, Adorations and Cave of the Heart.

In 1985, the work was revived, with Eilber as soloist, for the 50th anniversary of Graham's collaboration with Noguchi. Blakeley White-McGuire appeared as the pioneer woman in 2009 for a performance celebrating 75 years of dance programming at the 92nd Street Y.
