= Vision of the Apocalypse =

Vision of the Apocalypse was a modern dance created by Martha Graham to music by Hermann Reutter. It premiered on April 14, 1929, at the Booth Theatre in New York City. The occasion marked the debut of Martha Graham and Group, Graham's new concert ensemble and the predecessor to the Martha Graham Dance Company. Vision of the Apocalypse was the first piece Graham choreographed for a large group.

== Synopsis ==
Subtitled Theme and Variations, the ballet was danced in nine sections: Vision, Toil, Famine, Blasphemy, Ruthlessness, Pestilence, Mourning, Prayer and Death. Reutter's music, Variations on Bach's Chorale 'Komm' Süsser Tod' (Come Sweet Death) served as a structure for the work. Graham did not appear in the dance, which was performed by Kitty Reese and company members. Each episode was intended to reflect the emotional experiences of "a young monk contemplating the sorrows of the world."

Elevated on a platform above stage level, Reese portrayed the monk, reacting to the dancers below by means of pantomime. The chorus was costumed in black and gray, which combined with the "wooden impersonality and drive" of its movements, created a sinister mood.

== Critical reception ==
The critic for Dance Magazine praised the performance: "Many of the variations contained feats of technique, but all were accomplished with an amazing ease and actual élan." Louis Horst's piano accompaniment was called "sympathetic and invaluable." Years later, Graham biographer Mark Franko described Vision of the Apocalypse as "a figure viewing the suffering and miseries of an enslaved humanity," noting that the dance was made in the year of the stock market crash and the "collapse of bourgeois security." At the time, most performers were "doing isolated sketches on a variety of unrelated, superficial topics."
