= Figure of a Saint =

Modern dance solo by Martha Graham

Figure of a Saint was a modern dance solo choreographed by Martha Graham to the music of George Frideric Handel. The work premiered on January 24, 1929, at The Bennett School in Millbrook, New York. The all solo program also included: Valse Noble, Maid with the Flaxen Hair, Fragilite, In a Boat, Insincerities (Petulance, Remorse, Politeness, Vivacity), Tanagra (Gnossienne 1 and 2), Scherzo Waltz, Deux Valses Sentimentales, Prelude and La Cancion. Louis Horst accompanied Graham on piano.

== Background notes ==
Almost all of Graham's early works are lost, Figure of a Saint included. At the time Graham choreographed the piece, primitive religious art was popular among theater intellectuals as a source of iconography. Created in 1926, Florentine Madonna is her earliest known work derived from Biblical sources. Religious subjects remained part of Graham's reference material throughout her lifetime of making dances.
