= Primitive Mysteries =

Primitive Mysteries is a modern dance work choreographed by Martha Graham to music by Louis Horst. Graham also designed the original costumes. The piece premiered on February 2, 1931 at the Craig Theatre in New York City. From the first performance, critics hailed the ballet as a masterpiece and acknowledged Graham's rising role as a major force in American dance.

== Theme and structure ==
The stark, minimalistic piece is staged for a female soloist, garbed in white, and an ensemble of sixteen female dancers, dressed in blue. The title and theme reference religious rituals as performed by Native Americans of the Southwest U.S. Graham began work on the ballet shortly after she and Horst returned from a trip to New Mexico, her imagination sparked by ceremonial dances of the native peoples.

The dance is divided into three sections: Hymn to the Virgin, Crucifixus and Hosannah. In the original staging, Graham danced the role of The Virgin with the other cast members as celebrants.

- Hymn to the Virgin - In this scene, the soloist blesses the group of women surrounding her. All of the dancers enter and leave the stage three times in silence. The soloist and other cast members make gestures of praying, rejoicing and comforting. At one point, the ensemble places outstretched hands around the lead dancer's head in rays suggesting a halo.
- Crucifixus - This section takes its visual cues from the image of the crucified Christ. The soloist expresses her suffering by repeatedly cupping her hands to her face. The ensemble reflects the motion as they cup hands at hip level.
- Hosannah - In this scene, all of the dancers move in joyful celebration. One chorus member breaks from the group to form a succession of tableaus with the soloist. The pair's postures evoke imagery from Christianity, as well as other religions.

In each section, the Virgin enters and leaves the stage with the women in blue. Each section ends with the chorus encircling the Mary figure.

Dance critic John Martin described the ballet as "the ritual integrity of a religious people who have welcomed the young gods of the white people into the company of their own ageless Indian deities of earth and sky." Some viewers thought the work's overtly religious nature groundbreaking for the era.

When the ballet was revived in 1999, Graham provided further insight, saying the work was not intended to represent adorants worshiping The Virgin, but as a ceremonial rite of initiation celebrating the figure through one of their own. She also revealed the inspiration for her diaphanous organdy costume as the night-blooming Cereus that flowered outside her Santa Barbara window.

== Performance history ==
Primitive Mysteries is one of Graham's signature pieces, lauded from its debut as a masterwork. Yuriko was the first dancer other than Graham to perform the lead role. Others who have appeared as the Virgin Mary include Takako Asakawa, Christine Dakin and Terese Capucilli. The dance is frequently performed by the Graham company.
