= Norman Lloyd (composer) =

American pianist, composer, and music educator (1909–1980)

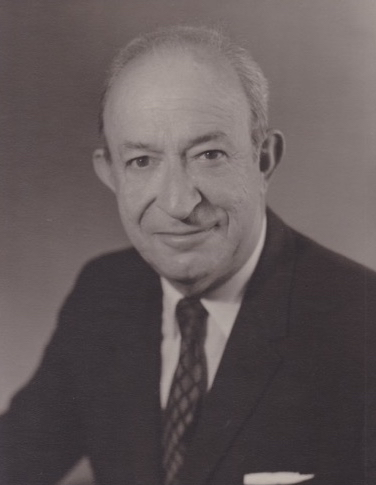
- Lloyd, in an undated photo
- Born: November 8, 1909
- Died: July 31, 1980 (aged 70); Greenwich, Connecticut, U.S.
- Education: New York University; Philadelphia Conservatory of Music (PhD)
- Occupations: Pianist; composer; music educator; author; musicologist
- Years active: 1920–1970s
- Employers: Bennington College; Juilliard School; Oberlin College; Rockefeller Foundation
- Style: Classical; chamber
- Spouse: Ruth Dorothy Rohrbacher (m. 1933)
- Children: 2

Norman Lloyd (November 8, 1909 – July 31, 1980) was an American pianist, composer, educator, author, and supporter of the arts who scored works for modern dance, documentary film, and classical chamber. Through his work as an educator, notably at Juilliard, he exerted a significant influence on the teaching of music theory, and later as the author of books including the popular Fundamentals of Sight Singing and Ear Training (co-authored with Arnold Fish). He continued to influence and support the arts as creator of the Rockefeller Foundation's arts program and its first director. He was the son of David Lloyd, a steel mill worker and minor league baseball player, and grandson of William Lloyd, a coal miner who immigrated to the United States from Wales in 1845.

== Career ==
His professional career began as an 11-year-old piano accompanist for silent films in the early 1920s. He received both his bachelor's and master's degrees from NYU, where he studied musical composition under Aaron Copland. It was also at NYU that Lloyd met fellow piano accompanist Ruth Dorothy Rohrbacher, whom he married in 1933 and with whom he collaborated on books and musical projects throughout his life. They had two sons, David and Alex. In the mid-1930s, Lloyd was hired to work as a pianist and composer in the newly created summer dance program at Bennington College, alongside choreographers Martha Graham, José Limón, Doris Humphrey, and others. During the summers at Bennington, he scored many works for dance, including "Panorama" for Graham and "Lament for Ignacio Sanchez Mejias" with Humphrey choreographing for Limón. The Bennington collaboration of artists during those years is considered by many to be the foundation of modern dance as an American art form.

Lloyd went on to serve as Director of Education at the Juilliard School in New York City from 1946 to 1949, where he established a new dance division with Martha Hill as director, and invited Graham, Limón, and other Bennington choreographers to join the faculty. During this period, he and Juilliard president William Schuman designed a new and innovative approach to the study of musical theory, entitled "The Literature and Materials of Music", which shifted the emphasis away from textbooks and rigorous ear training to discussion and direct pedagogy by composers in the classroom. He and Schuman were committed to teaching music from a more holistic approach that would "make responsible adults of musicians". The new curriculum was intended to disrupt what the two men considered to be an overly insular culture and rigidly formal training regimen at Juilliard, and effectively altered the course of American musical education towards the more comprehensive and progressive path on which it remains today.

Lloyd also continued to compose works for leading choreographers, including Limón's 1947 work "La Malinche", as well as chamber works for the piano and violin. He worked tirelessly as a teacher and educator and his influence can be felt in the works of the many students who passed through Juilliard during his tenure. He eventually left Juilliard in 1963 to serve as Dean of the Oberlin College conservatory; he received a Doctorate of Music from the Philadelphia Conservatory of Music the same year.

In 1965, he left Oberlin to create the Rockefeller Foundation's arts program, serving there as Director of Arts Programming until 1972. He published a number of books during his career, including the Golden Encyclopedia of Music, Fireside Book of Favorite American Songs, and Fireside Book of Folk Songs. He played a pivotal role in the re-emergence and popularity of Scott Joplin's ragtime tunes some 30 years after the Depression, when he persuaded Vera Brodsky Lawrence to edit The Collected Works of Scott Joplin.

Lloyd died of leukemia at his home in Greenwich, Connecticut, on July 31, 1980, at the age of 70.
