= Martha Graham =

American dancer and choreographer (1894–1991)

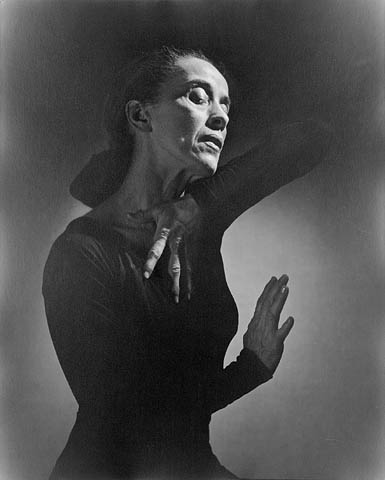
- Graham in 1948
- Born: May 11, 1894; Pittsburgh, Pennsylvania, U.S.
- Died: April 1, 1991 (aged 96); New York City, U.S.
- Known for: Dance and choreography
- Movement: Modern dance
- Spouse: Erick Hawkins (m. 1948–1954)
- Awards: Kennedy Center Honors (1979); Presidential Medal of Freedom (1976); National Medal of Arts (1985)

Martha Graham (May 11, 1894 – April 1, 1991) was an American modern dancer, teacher and choreographer responsible for creating the Graham technique.

Graham danced and taught for over seventy years. She was the first dancer to perform at the White House, travel abroad as a cultural ambassador, and receive the highest civilian award of the US: the Presidential Medal of Freedom with Distinction. In her lifetime she received honors including the Key to the City of Paris and Japan's Imperial Order of the Precious Crown.

== Early life ==
Graham was born in Allegheny City, later to become part of Pittsburgh, Pennsylvania, in 1894. Her father, George Graham, was an "alienist", a practitioner of an early form of psychiatry. The Grahams were Presbyterians. Her father was a third-generation American of Irish descent. Graham's mother, Jane Beers, was a second-generation American of Irish, Scots-Irish, and English ancestry, and who claimed to be a tenth-generation descendant of Myles Standish. While her parents provided a comfortable environment in her youth, it was not one that encouraged dancing.

The Graham family moved to Santa Barbara, California, when Martha was fourteen years old. In 1911, she attended the first dance performance of her life, watching Ruth St. Denis perform at the Mason Opera House in Los Angeles. In the mid-1910s, Martha Graham began her studies at the newly created Denishawn School of Dancing and Related Arts, founded by Ruth St. Denis and Ted Shawn, at which she would stay until 1923. In 1922, Graham performed one of Shawn's Egyptian dances with Lillian Powell in a short silent film by Hugo Riesenfeld that attempted to synchronize a dance routine on film with a live orchestra and an onscreen conductor.

== Career ==
Graham left the Denishawn establishment in 1923 in order to become a featured dancer in the Greenwich Village Follies revue for two years.

In 1925, Graham was employed at the Eastman School of Music where Rouben Mamoulian was head of the School of Drama. Among other performances, together Mamoulian and Graham produced a short two-color film called The Flute of Krishna, featuring Eastman students. Mamoulian left Eastman shortly thereafter and Graham chose to leave also, even though she was asked to stay on.

In 1926, the Martha Graham Center of Contemporary Dance was established, in a small studio on the Upper East Side of New York City. On April 18 of the same year Graham debuted her first independent concert, consisting of 18 short solos and trios that she had choreographed. This performance took place at the 48th Street Theatre in Manhattan. She would later say of the concert: "Everything I did was influenced by Denishawn." On November 28, 1926, Graham and others in her company gave a dance recital at the Klaw Theatre in New York City. Around the same time she entered an extended collaboration with Japanese-American pictorialist photographer Soichi Sunami. Graham was on the faculty of Neighborhood Playhouse School of the Theatre when it opened in 1928.

One of Graham's students was heiress Bethsabée de Rothschild with whom she became close friends. When Rothschild moved to Israel and established the Batsheva Dance Company in 1965, Graham became the company's first director.

Graham's technique pioneered a principle known as "contraction and release" in modern dance, which was derived from a stylized conception of breathing.

In conjunction with the 1936 Summer Olympic Games in Berlin, the German government wanted to include dance in the Art Competitions that took place during the Olympics, an event that previously included architecture, sculpture, painting, music, and literature. Although Joseph Goebbels, Reich Minister of Propaganda, was not appreciative of the modern dance art form and changed Germany's dance from more avant-garde to traditional, he and Adolf Hitler still agreed to invite Graham to represent the United States. However, the United States was not represented in the Art Competitions as Graham refused the invitation by stating:

I would find it impossible to dance in Germany at the present time. So many artists whom I respect and admire have been persecuted, have been deprived of the right to work for ridiculous and unsatisfactory reasons, that I should consider it impossible to identify myself, by accepting the invitation, with the regime that has made such things possible. In addition, some of my concert group would not be welcomed in Germany.

Goebbels himself wrote her a letter assuring her that her Jewish dancers would "receive complete immunity". Graham nevertheless rejected the invitation.

Stimulated by the occurrences of the 1936 Olympic Games, and the propaganda that she heard through the radio from the Axis powers, Graham created American Document in 1938. The dance expressed American ideals and democracy as Graham realized that it could empower men and inspire them to fight fascist and Nazi ideologies. American Document ended up as a patriotic statement focusing on rights and injustices of the time, representing the American people including its Native-American heritage and slavery. During the performance, excerpts from the U.S. Declaration of Independence, Lincoln's Gettysburg Address, and the Emancipation Proclamation were read. These were passages that highlighted the American ideals and represented what made the American people American. For Graham, a dance needed to "reveal certain national characteristics because without these characteristics the dance would have no validity, no roots, no direct relation to life".

In 1938, the Roosevelt family invited Graham to dance at the White House, making her the first dancer to perform there. In the same year, Erick Hawkins became the first man to dance with her company. He officially joined her troupe the following year, dancing male lead in a number of Graham's works. They were married in July 1948 after the New York premiere of Night Journey. He left her troupe in 1951 and they divorced in 1954.

On April 1, 1958, the Martha Graham Dance Company premiered the ballet Clytemnestra, which would become a success. With a score by Egyptian-born composer Halim El-Dabh, this ballet was a large scale work and the only full-length work in Graham's career. Graham choreographed and danced the title role, spending almost the entire duration of the performance on the stage. The ballet tells the story of Queen Clytemnestra, who is married to King Agamemnon. Agamemnon sacrifices their daughter Iphigenia on a pyre, as an offering to the gods to assure fair winds to Troy, where the Trojan War rages. Upon Agamemnon's return after 10 years, Clytemnestra kills Agamemnon to avenge the murder of Iphigenia. Clytemnestra is then murdered by her son, Orestes, and the audience experiences Clytemnestra in the afterworld. The ballet had a limited engagement showing at the 54th Street Theatre on Broadway, conducted by Robert Irving, voice parts sung by Rosalia Maresca and Ronald Holgate.

Graham collaborated with many composers including Aaron Copland on Appalachian Spring, Louis Horst, Samuel Barber, William Schuman, Carlos Surinach, Norman Dello Joio, and Gian Carlo Menotti. Graham's mother died in Santa Barbara in 1958. Her oldest friend and musical collaborator Louis Horst died in 1964. She said of Horst: "His sympathy and understanding, but primarily his faith, gave me a landscape to move in. Without it, I should certainly have been lost."

Graham resisted requests for her dances to be recorded because she believed that stage performances should only be experienced live. There were a few notable exceptions. For example, in addition to her collaboration with Sunami in the 1920s, she also worked on a limited basis with still photographers Imogen Cunningham in the 1930s, and Barbara Morgan in the 1940s. Graham considered Philippe Halsman's photographs of Dark Meadow the most complete photographic record of any of her dances. Halsman also photographed in the 1940s Letter to the World, Cave of the Heart, Night Journey and Every Soul is a Circus. In later years her opinion changed. In 1952 Graham allowed taping of her meeting and cultural exchange with famed deaf-blind author, activist and lecturer Helen Keller, who, after a visit to one of Graham's company rehearsals became a close friend and supporter. Graham was inspired by Keller's joy from and interpretation of dance, utilizing her body to feel the vibration of drums and of feet and movement moving the air around her.

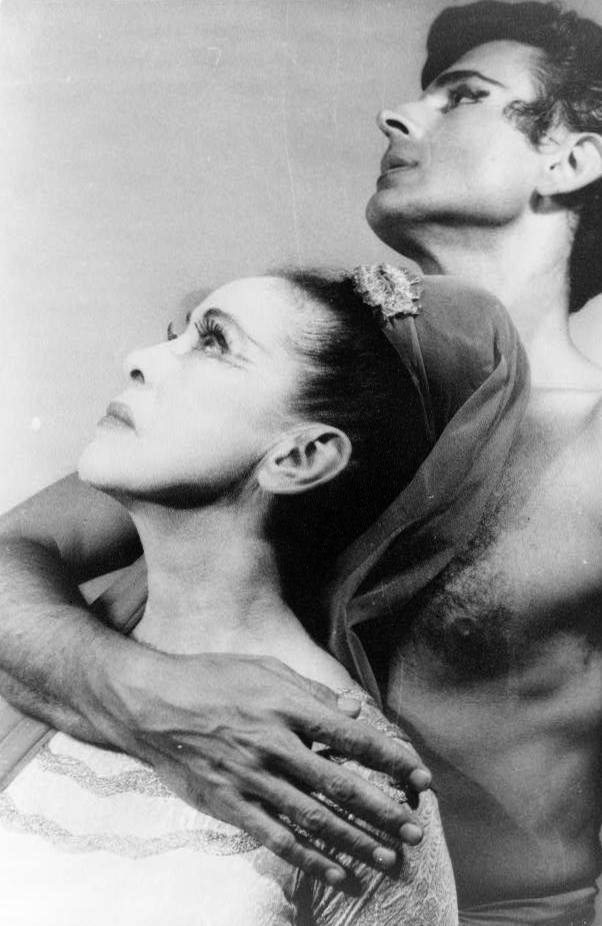
Martha Graham with Bertram Ross (1961)

In her biography Martha, Agnes de Mille cites Graham's last performance as having occurred on the evening of May 25, 1968, in Time of Snow. But in A Dancer's Life, biographer Russell Freedman lists the year of Graham's final performance as 1969. In her 1991 autobiography, Blood Memory, Graham herself lists her final performance as her 1970 appearance in Cortege of Eagles when she was 76 years old. Graham's choreographies span 181 compositions.

== Retirement and later years ==
In the years that followed her departure from the stage, Graham sank into a deep depression fueled by views from the wings of young dancers performing many of the dances she had choreographed for herself and her former husband. Graham's health declined precipitously as she abused alcohol to numb her pain. In Blood Memory she wrote,

It wasn't until years after I had relinquished a ballet that I could bear to watch someone else dance it. I believe in never looking back, never indulging in nostalgia, or reminiscing. Yet how can you avoid it when you look on stage and see a dancer made up to look as you did thirty years ago, dancing a ballet you created with someone you were then deeply in love with, your husband? I think that is a circle of hell Dante omitted.

[When I stopped dancing] I had lost my will to live. I stayed home alone, ate very little, and drank too much and brooded. My face was ruined, and people say I looked odd, which I agreed with. Finally my system just gave in. I was in the hospital for a long time, much of it in a coma.

Graham not only survived her hospital stay, but she rallied. In 1972, she quit drinking, returned to her studio, reorganized her company, and went on to choreograph ten new ballets and many revivals. Her last completed ballet was 1990's Maple Leaf Rag.

== Death ==
Graham choreographed until her death in New York City from pneumonia in 1991, aged 96. Just before she became sick with pneumonia, she finished the final draft of her autobiography, Blood Memory, which was published posthumously in the fall of 1991. She was cremated, and her ashes were spread over the Sangre de Cristo Mountains in northern New Mexico.

== Influence and legacy ==
Graham has been sometimes termed the "Picasso of Dance" in that her importance and influence to modern dance can be considered equivalent to what Pablo Picasso was to modern visual arts. Her impact has been also compared to the influence of Stravinsky on music and Frank Lloyd Wright on architecture.

Graham has been said to be the one that brought dance into the 20th century. Due to the work of her assistants, Linda Hodes, Pearl Lang, Diane Gray, Yuriko, and others, much of Graham's work and technique have been preserved. They taped interviews of Graham describing her entire technique and videos of her performances. Glen Tetley told Agnes de Mille, "The wonderful thing about Martha in her good days was her generosity. So many people stole Martha's unique personal vocabulary, consciously or unconsciously, and performed it in concerts. I have never once heard Martha say, 'So-and-so has used my choreography.'" An entire movement was created by her that revolutionized the dance world and created what is known today as modern dance. Now, dancers all over the world study and perform modern dance. Choreographers and professional dancers look to her for inspiration.

Agnes de Mille said:

The greatest thing [Graham] ever said to me was in 1943 after the opening of Oklahoma!, when I suddenly had unexpected, flamboyant success for a work I thought was only fairly good, after years of neglect for work I thought was fine. I was bewildered and worried that my entire scale of values was untrustworthy. I talked to Martha. I remember the conversation well. It was in a Schrafft's restaurant over a soda. I confessed that I had a burning desire to be excellent, but no faith that I could be. Martha said to me, very quietly: "There is a vitality, a life force, an energy, a quickening that is translated through you into action, and because there is only one of you in all of time, this expression is unique. And if you block it, it will never exist through any other medium and it will be lost. The world will not have it. It is not your business to determine how good it is nor how valuable nor how it compares with other expressions. It is your business to keep it yours clearly and directly, to keep the channel open. You do not even have to believe in yourself or your work. You have to keep yourself open and aware to the urges that motivate you. Keep the channel open ... No artist is pleased. [There is] no satisfaction whatever at any time. There is only a queer divine dissatisfaction, a blessed unrest that keeps us marching and makes us more alive than the others."

To celebrate what would have been her 117th birthday on May 11, 2011, Google's logo for one day was turned into one dedicated to Graham's life and legacy.

In 2013, the dance films by her were selected for preservation in the National Film Registry by the registry's owner, the Library of Congress. The four films specifically chosen together are noted below in choreography section.

In 2019 Time created 89 new covers to celebrate women of the year starting from 1920; it chose Graham for 1930.

In 2021 actress Mary Beth Peil portrayed Graham in the Netflix series Halston.

== Martha Graham Dance Company ==
The Martha Graham Dance Company is the oldest dance company in America, founded in 1926. It has helped develop many famous dancers and choreographers of the 20th and 21st centuries including Erick Hawkins, Anna Sokolow, Merce Cunningham, Lila York, and Paul Taylor. It continues to perform, including at the Saratoga Performing Arts Center in June 2008. The company also performed in 2007 at the Museum of Contemporary Art, Chicago, with a program consisting of: Appalachian Spring, Embattled Garden, Errand into the Maze, and American Original.

Among the dancers who passed through her company in 1978 was the singer Madonna, a few years before she became famous. The singer, who greatly admires Graham, was nicknamed "Madame X" by her, which would be the name of her 14th studio album in 2019.

=== Early dancers ===
Graham's original female dancers consisted of Bessie Schonberg, Evelyn Sabin, Martha Hill, Gertrude Shurr, Anna Sokolow, Nelle Fisher, Dorothy Bird, Bonnie Bird, Sophie Maslow, May O'Donnell, Jane Dudley, Anita Alvarez, Pearl Lang, and Marjorie G. Mazia. A second group included Yuriko, Ethel Butler, Ethel Winter, Jean Erdman, Patricia Birch, Nina Fonaroff, Matt Turney, Mary Hinkson. The group of male dancers was made up of Erick Hawkins, Merce Cunningham, David Campbell, John Butler, Robert Cohan, Stuart Hodes, Glen Tetley, Bertram Ross, Paul Taylor, Donald McKayle, Mark Ryder, and William Carter.

== Accolades ==
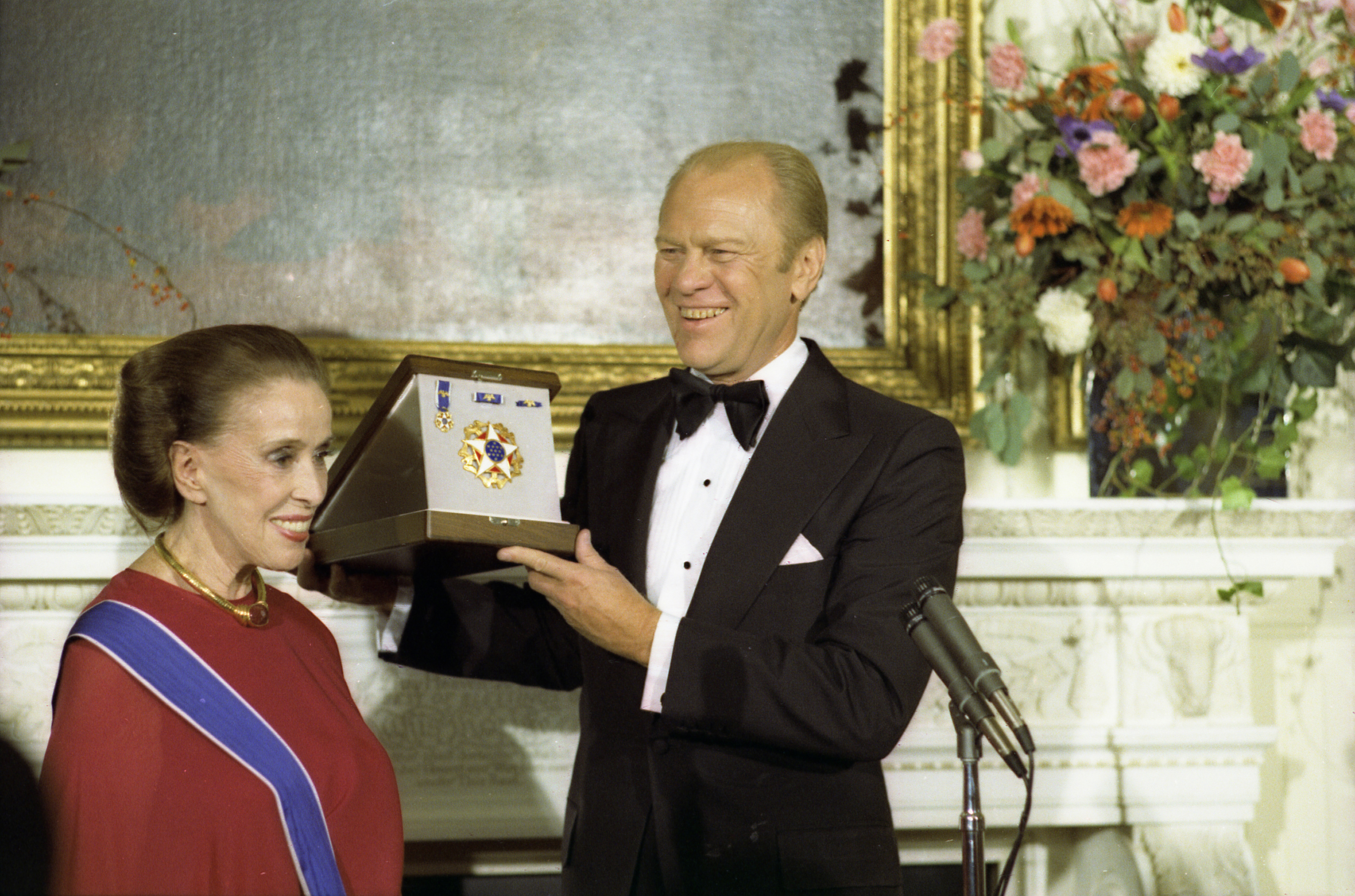
President Gerald Ford awarding the Presidential Medal of Freedom with Distinction to Martha Graham, 1976

During her career, Graham was awarded a Guggenheim Fellowship in Choreography three times- one in 1932 (which she rejected—she didn't want to go to Europe), one in 1943, and one in 1944.

In 1957, Graham was elected a Fellow of the American Academy of Arts and Sciences. She was awarded the Presidential Medal of Freedom in 1976 by President Gerald Ford (the First Lady Betty Ford had studied under Graham in her youth). Ford declared her "a national treasure".

Graham was the first recipient of the Samuel H. Scripps/American Dance Festival Award for lifetime achievement in modern dance in 1981, presented by Betty Ford.

In 1984, Graham was awarded the highest French order of merit, the Legion of Honour by then Minister of culture Jack Lang.

Graham was inducted into the National Museum of Dance's Mr. & Mrs. Cornelius Vanderbilt Whitney Hall of Fame in 1987.

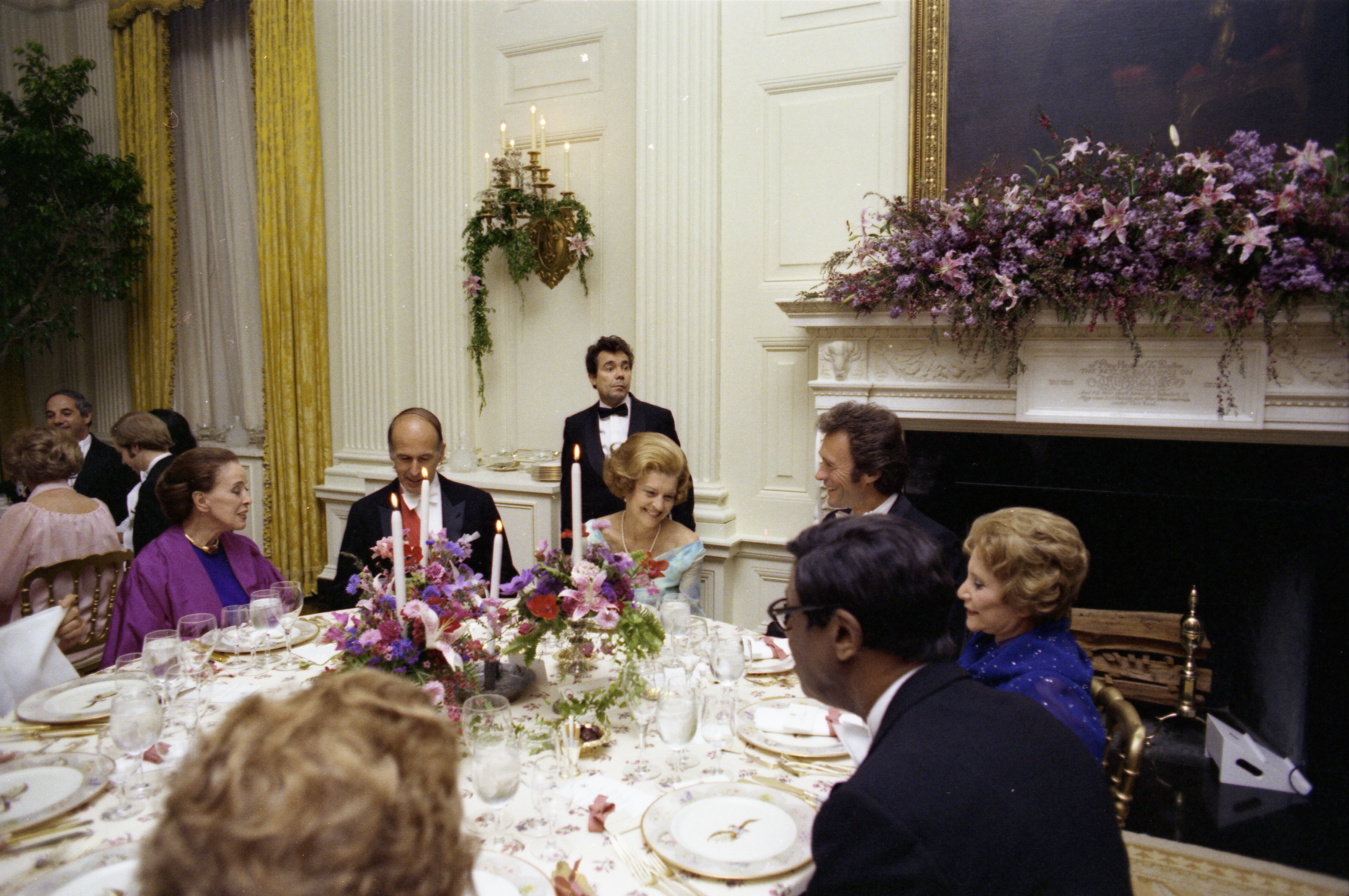
First Lady Betty Ford, President Valery Giscard d'Estaing of France, Choreographer Martha Graham, Actor Clint Eastwood, Fashion Designer Adele Simpson, and Jazz Pianist Earl Hines Seated in the State Dining Room

In 1990, the Council of Fashion Designers of America awarded Graham with the Geoffrey Beene Lifetime Achievement Award.

In 1998, Graham was posthumously named "Dancer of the Century" by Time magazine, and one of the female "Icons of the Century" by People.

In 2015, she was posthumously inducted into the National Women's Hall of Fame.

On May 11, 2020, on what would have been Graham's 126th birthday, the New York Public Library for the Performing Arts announced it had acquired Graham's archives for its Jerome Robbins Dance Division. The archive consists mainly of paper-based material, photographs and films, including rare footage of Graham dancing in works such as "Appalachian Spring" and "Hérodiade"; her script for "Night Journey"; and her handwritten notes for "American Document".

== Choreography ==
This excerpt from John Martin's reviews in The New York Times provides insight on Graham's choreographic style. "Frequently the vividness and intensity of her purpose are so potent that on the rise of the curtain they strike like a blow, and in that moment one must decide whether he is for or against her. She boils down her moods and movements until they are devoid of all extraneous substances and are concentrated to the highest degree." Graham created 181 ballets.

Year	Performance	Music	Notes
1926	Chorale	César Franck	
1926	Novelette	Robert Schumann	
1927	Lugubre	Alexander Scriabin	
1927	Revolt	Arthur Honegger	
1927	Fragilité	Alexander Scriabin	
1927	Scherza	Robert Schumann	
1929	Figure of a Saint	George Frideric Handel	
1929	Resurrection	Tibor Harsányi	
1929	Adolescence	Paul Hindemith	
1929	Danza	Darius Milhaud	
1929	Vision of the Apocalypse	Hermann Reutter	
1929	Insincerities	Sergei Prokofiev	
1929	Moment Rustica	Francis Poulenc	
1929	Heretic	from folklore	Old Breton song, Tetus Breton, as arranged by Charles de Sivry; added to the United States National Film Registry for preservation in 2013 along with three other Martha Graham dance films
1930	Lamentation	Zoltán Kodály	Sets by Isamu Noguchi; added to the United States National Film Registry for preservation in 2013 along with three other Martha Graham dance films
1930	Harlequinade	Ernst Toch	Costumes by Graham
1931	Primitive Mysteries	Louis Horst	
1931	Bacchanale	Wallingford Riegger	
1931	Dolorosa	Heitor Villa-Lobos	
1933	Romeo and Juliet	Paul Nordoff	Dance sequences for a Katharine Cornell production
1934	Dance in Four Parts	George Antheil	
1934	Celebration	Louis Horst	Costumes by Martha Graham
1935	Praeludium	Paul Nordoff	Costumes by Graham (1935), by Edythe Gilfond (1938)
1935	Frontier	Louis Horst	Sets by Isamu Noguchi; added to the United States National Film Registry for preservation in 2013 along with three other Martha Graham dance films
1935	Course	George Antheil	
1936	Steps in the Street	Wallingford Riegger	Part of Chronicle
1936	Chronicle	Wallingford Riegger	Lighting by Jean Rosenthal
1936	Horizons	Louis Horst	Sets by Alexander Calder
1936	Salutation	Lehman Engel	
1937	Deep Song	Henry Cowell	
1937	Opening Dance	Norman Lloyd	
1937	Immediate Tragedy	Henry Cowell	
1937	American Lyric	Alex North	Costumes by Edythe Gilfond
1938	American Document	Ray Green	Sets by Arch Lauterer, costumes by Edythe Gilfond
1939	Columbiad	Louis Horst	Sets by Philip Stapp, costumes by Edythe Gilfond
1939	Every Soul is a Circus	Paul Nordoff	Sets by Philip Stapp, costumes by Edythe Gilfond
1940	El Penitente	Louis Horst	Original sets by Arch Lauterer, costumes by Edythe Gilfond, sets later redesigned by Isamu Noguchi
1940	Letter to the World	Hunter Johnson	Sets by Arch Lauterer, costumes by Edythe Gilfond
1941	Punch and the Judy	Robert McBride	Sets by Arch Lauterer, costumes by Charlotte Trowbridge, text by Edward Gordon Craig
1942	Land Be Bright	Arthur Kreutz	Sets and costumes by Charlotte Trowbridge
1943	Deaths and Entrances	Hunter Johnson	Sets by Arch Lauterer, costumes by Edythe Gilfond (1943) and by Oscar de la Renta (2005)
1943	Salem Shore	Paul Nordoff	Sets by Arch Lauterer, costumes by Edythe Gilfond
1944	Appalachian Spring	Aaron Copland	Sets by Isamu Noguchi; added to the United States National Film Registry for preservation in 2013 along with three other Martha Graham dance films
1944	Imagined Wing	Darius Milhaud	Sets by Isamu Noguchi, costumes by Edythe Gilfond
1944	Hérodiade	Paul Hindemith	Sets by Isamu Noguchi
1946	Dark Meadow	Carlos Chávez	Sets by Isamu Noguchi, costumes by Edythe Gilfond, and lighting by Jean Rosenthal.
1946	Cave of the Heart	Samuel Barber	Sets by Isamu Noguchi, costumes by Edythe Gilfond, and lighting by Jean Rosenthal.
1947	Errand into the Maze	Gian Carlo Menotti	Sets by Isamu Noguchi, lighting by Jean Rosenthal
1947	Night Journey	William Schuman	Sets by Isamu Noguchi
1948	Diversion of Angels	Norman Dello Joio	Sets by Isamu Noguchi (eliminated after the first performance)
1950	Judith	William Schuman	Sets by Isamu Noguchi, lighting by Jean Rosenthal
1951	The Triumph of St. Joan	Norman Dello Joio	
1952	Canticle for Innocent Comedians	Thomas Ribbink	
1954	Ardent Song	Alan Hovhaness	
1955	Seraphic Dialogue	Norman Dello Joio	Sets by Isamu Noguchi
1958	Clytemnestra	Halim El-Dabh	Sets by Isamu Noguchi, costumes by Graham and Helen McGehee
1958	Embattled Garden	Carlos Surinach	Sets by Isamu Noguchi
1959	Episodes	Anton Webern	Commissioned by New York City Ballet
1960	Acrobats of God	Carlos Surinach	
1960	Alcestis	Vivian Fine	
1961	Visionary Recital	Robert Starer	Revised as Samson Agonistes in 1962
1961	One More Gaudy Night	Halim El-Dabh	
1962	Phaedra	Robert Starer	Sets by Isamu Noguchi
1962	A Look at Lightning	Halim El-Dabh	
1962	Secular Games	Robert Starer	
1962	Legend of Judith	Mordecai Seter	
1963	Circe	Alan Hovhaness	Sets by Isamu Noguchi
1965	The Witch of Endor	William Schuman	
1967	Cortege of Eagles	Eugene Lester	Sets by Isamu Noguchi
1968	A Time of Snow	Norman Dello Joio	
1968	Plain of Prayer	Eugene Lester	
1968	The Lady of the House of Sleep	Robert Starer	
1969	The Archaic Hours	Eugene Lester	
1973	Mendicants of Evening	David G. Walker	Revised as Chronique in 1974
1973	Myth of a Voyage	Alan Hovhaness	
1974	Holy Jungle	Robert Starer	
1974	Jacob's Dream	Mordecai Seter	
1975	Lucifer	Halim El-Dabh	
1975	Adorations	Mateo Albéniz; Domenico Cimarosa; John Dowland; Girolamo Frescobaldi	
1975	Point of Crossing	Mordecai Seter	
1975	The Scarlet Letter	Hunter Johnson	
1977	O Thou Desire Who Art About to Sing	Meyer Kupferman	
1977	Shadows	Gian Carlo Menotti	
1978	The Owl and the Pussycat	Carlos Surinach	
1978	Ecuatorial	Edgard Varèse	
1978	Flute of Pan	Traditional music.	
1978 or 1979	Frescoes	Samuel Barber	
1979	Episodes	Anton Webern	reconstructed and reworked
1980	Judith	Edgard Varèse	
1981	Acts of Light	Carl Nielsen	Costumes by Halston
1982	Dances of the Golden Hall	Andrzej Panufnik	
1982	Andromanche's Lament	Samuel Barber	
1983	Phaedra's Dream	George Crumb (his Lux Aeterna)	
1984	The Rite of Spring	Igor Stravinsky	
1985	Song	Romanian folk music	played on the pan flute by Gheorghe Zamfir with Marcel Cellier on the organ
1986	Temptations of the Moon	Béla Bartók	
1986	Tangled Night	Klaus Egge	
1987	Perséphone	Igor Stravinsky	Costumes by Halston
1988	Night Chant	R. Carlos Nakai	Set by Isamu Noguchi
1989	American Document (new version)	John Corigliano	Guest Artist M.Baryshinikov
1990	Maple Leaf Rag	Scott Joplin	costumes by Calvin Klein, lighting by David Finley
1991	The Eyes of the Goddess (unfinished)	Carlos Surinach	Sets by Marisol

== See also ==
- American Dance Festival
- Christine Dakin
- Concert dance
- List of dancers
- List of dance companies
- Postmodern dance
- Terese Capucilli
- Women in dance

== Citations ==
=== Cited sources ===
- Bryant Pratt, Paula (1994). The Importance of Martha Graham. Detroit: Gale. ISBN 9781560060567.
- de Mille, Agnes (1991). Martha: The Life and Work of Martha Graham. New York: Random House. ISBN 978-0-394-55643-7.
- Franko, Mark (2012). Martha Graham in Love and War: The Life in the Work.
- Freedman, Russell (1998). Martha Graham – A Dancer's Life. New York City: Clarion Books. ISBN 978-0-395-74655-4.
- Graham, Martha (1991). Blood Memory: An Autobiography. New York: Doubleday. ISBN 978-0-385-26503-4.
- Hanley, E. (2004). The Role of Dance in the 1936 Berlin Olympic Games.
- Mansfield Soares, Janet (1992). Louis Horst – Musician in a Dancer's World. Durham, North Carolina: Duke University Press. ISBN 978-0-8223-1226-0.
- Newman, Gerald (1998). Martha Graham: Founder of Modern Dance. Danbury, Connecticut: Franklin Watts. ISBN 9780531114421.
