= Judith (ballet) =

1950 ballet by Martha Graham

Judith is a solo work created by dancer/choreographer Martha Graham. William Schuman composed the music. Charles Hyman designed the original set, which was replaced almost immediately by one conceived by Isamu Noguchi. He also added jewelry and a headdress. Jean Rosenthal provided the lighting. The piece premiered on January 4, 1950, at the Columbia Auditorium in Louisville, Kentucky.

== Concept and theme ==
The idea for a "dance concerto" was proposed by Louise Kain, a patroness of the arts and a board member of the Louisville Philharmonic Society. She suggested Graham perform with the musicians in the manner of a musical concerto, with the dancer replacing the solo instrument. The plan was met with enthusiasm by all parties.

Taken from the deuterocanonical books of the Bible (Apocrypha), the ballet is a dance dramatization of the story of Judith, the Hebrew widow who saves the city of Bethulia by seducing and beheading the invading Assyrian tyrant Holofernes.

== Synopsis and musical structure ==
In 1949, Graham turned to William Schuman for the score. They had collaborated two years earlier on the highly successful Night Journey.

The music and dance advance in five uninterrupted movements. Graham performed in front of the orchestra, which was partially obscured behind a translucent panel.

1. Adagio – The piece opens with a dark adagio featuring muted strings punctuated by occasional solo woodwind and harsh brass. The section represents the plight of the Israelites, suffering and dying of thirst as Holofernes lays siege to their city. (Book of Judith 1-7:32, 4:40 minutes)
2. Moderato – Judith prepares to enter the enemy camp. Her anxious resolve is reflected in the music, which increases in intensity, culminating with strings and brass in a spirited jazz-inspired interplay. (Book of Judith 8.1-10.10, 3:25 minutes)
3. Tranquillo – A peaceful solo oboe passage followed by one for solo violin accompany Judith's prayers for guidance and her patient wait for a chance to confront Holofernes. (2:07 minutes)
4. Presto – The presto movement heightens the action in Holofernes tent, where Judith seduces the drunken general. The scene opens with rumbling timpani and accelerates with pizzicato strings. The beheading, which takes place behind a curtain in the choreography, is marked by frenzied repetitive brass chords that slowly fade away. (5:54 minutes)
5. Andante (Coda) – Judith's slow procession homeward carrying Holofernes' head. The music is measured and dignified rather than victorious.(Book of Judith 13:19, 3:04 minutes)

== Background notes ==
Graham created Judith at a pivotal point in her personal life. She had sustained a serious knee injury during the troupe's European tour that forced her to cancel all remaining performances. At the same time her husband and dance partner Erick Hawkins had asked for a divorce. Stuart Hodes wrote the dance manifested "Martha's uncanny way of anticipating the big changes in her life," adding a quote attributed to Pearl Lang, "Martha had to make that dance so she could cut off Erick's head!"

Judith was the first of Graham's biblical heroines and a departure from her myth-derived works. In a letter to Schuman, she wrote, "I do not want to make this in any way inhuman or goddess-like." She went on to make two subsequent dances based on the Hebrew heroine, Legend of Judith (1962) and Judith (1980).

Graham designed a series of costumes for the 1950 solo to convey Judith's transformation and evolving state of mind. "The dresses which constitute the garments for the various parts will be on the stage arranged as part of the scene itself. They will be in color and will be replaced as I see it when she finished with them as though they were to wait to be worn by someone else." Following the murder, Judith dons a blood red cloak.

Noguchi's three-legged balsa wood set consisted of stylized weapon-like elements, two crossed pieces resembling spears and an arrow-shaped member, supporting a fourth horizontal component evocative of an open-mouthed viper. The thick coil that makes up Judith's bracelet is also serpentine in nature, while the headpiece suggests rams' horns.

== Critical reception ==
Judith debuted to a sold-out house that included nationally known music critics. Time and Newsweek, as well as the New York and local papers ran feature articles on Graham and Schuman's achievement. "A triumphant success…a new form for the theatre…the dance concerto…," wrote Robert Sabin. "The two artists worked in close and careful collaboration, having benefited by their labors on Night Journey. The result is a theatre piece in which dance and movement are fused in seamless unity."

Two decades later and in spite of his artistic competition with her, Erick Hawkins praised Judith as "a magnificent work."
