= Harlequinade (Graham) =

Harlequinade was a solo modern dance by Martha Graham set to music by Ernst Toch. The work premiered on January 8, 1930, at Maxine Elliott's Theatre in New York City. The performance was part of a concert staged by the Dance Repertory Theatre, a group that included dancer/choreographers Doris Humphrey, Charles Weidman and Helen Tamiris. Their stated goal was "to give annually a season of continuous dance programs which will be representative of the art of dance in America and will give native artists an outlet for their creative work." Other new Graham works on the evening's program were Lamentation and Prelude to a Dance.

== Synopsis ==
Harlequinade was divided into two sections, Pessimist and Optimist. The biting portrait of the Pessimist and subtle portrayal of the Optimist were intended as symbols of all the tragedy and comedy in the world. The accompanying orchestra consisted of flute, clarinet, bass clarinet, trumpet, drums and voice.

As with much of her early work, little is known about the choreography. Barbara Morgan's photographs of Graham dancing in the Harlequinade costumes are virtually all that is known about the piece. The two outfits were also described in The Christian Science Monitor's 1938 review of a Boston performance. "Here the artist's own costuming - horizontal stripes for the former, billowing black taffeta, with a large red property handkerchief, for the latter, are punctuation marks."

== Critical reception ==
The New York Herald Tribune noted the work displayed "the Graham art at its scintillating best, both penetrating and disarming." The New York Times called it "extremely polished and penetrating." Not all critics found her a credible comedian. In 1932, The New York Sun reported the work was "invalidated by its obvious humor...Miss Graham seems incapable of stylizing this aspect of herself intruding a note of ineffectiveness into the general excellence of what she does."

From later reviews, it appears the dance did not hold up well compared to subsequent choreographic efforts. The February 1936 issue of the Dance Observer contained a critique that noted, "Miss Graham casts a shadow on her earlier powers," adding that her later dances possessed "greater depth and subtlety."
