= Bonnie Bird =

Bonnie Bird (April 30, 1914 – April 9, 1995) was an American modern dancer and dance educator.

Bird danced with Martha Graham in the 1930s and went on to a career as a dance educator in the United States and also in the United Kingdom, where she was awarded a Doctor of Arts degree, honoris causa, for her work pioneering degree programs in dance in the 1970s through the '90s at the Trinity Laban Conservatoire of Music and Dance. Educated at The Cornish School 1927–30, now Cornish College of the Arts, she is most popularly known for bringing together Merce Cunningham and John Cage upon her return to Cornish as head of dance in 1937.

== Early life ==
Born in 1914 in Portland Oregon, the eldest child of Scott Elliot Bird and the former Josephine Powers, Bird grew up in and around Seattle in Washington State, mostly on a farm in what is now Bothell, Washington. She attended public school in the city, commuting every day.

== Dance education ==
At the age of seven, at a time her family was living in Seattle, Bird was introduced to a neighbor who happened to be a ballet dancer and teacher, Caird Leslie. She began to take classes from him. Leslie had been dancing in the Ballet Intime in New York, the company of Russian dancer Adolph Bolm, who, as a member of the Ballets Russes, had partnered Anna Pavlova. When Pavlova toured through Seattle, Leslie introduced Bird to her. Captivated, Bird decided on a career as a dancer at that early age.

In 1927, when Bird was 13, Leslie became the head of the dance department at The Cornish School, bringing his students with him. Leslie left after only a short time, but many of his students remained. In 1928, Nellie Cornish changed focus of the curriculum of the dance department to modern dance. Two years later, Cornish brought in Martha Graham to teach a summer intensive course. Although Bird was too young to go at the time, Graham invited her to join her in New York when she finished high school. Graham also secured a scholarship for Bird to study at the Neighborhood Playhouse, which was required of her dancers preparing to join the Graham Group. Bird left Seattle for New York in the summer of 1931.

== Professional dance career ==
Bird formally joined the Graham Group in 1933, and went on to perform in Graham works Celebration, American Provincial, Panorama, and Chronicle, among others. She and another favorite of Graham's, Dorothy Bird—who, though sharing a surname, a home in the Pacific Northwest, and a Cornish School pedigree, was no relation—moved into rooms in Martha Graham's house in New York. Bird continued working as Graham's assistant, especially in putting together costumes for the Group. More importantly for her later career, She also began teaching under Graham. Bird danced with the Group until 1937.

== Academic career ==
At The Cornish School

In the fall of 1937, Bird returned to Cornish as head of the dance department. She found a department that was much diminished; Nellie Cornish had been distracted by problems with money and her board of directors. Among the five dance majors, Bird found some good dancers, including Dorothy Herrmann and especially Syvilla Fort, who would go on to dance with Katherine Dunham and become an influential teacher in New York. As it turned out, theater majors were required to take dance, and she was able to recruit from their ranks. Chief among these actor/dancers was Merce Cunningham. Bird gave her department a collaborative, company-orientation that included programs at Cornish and in the community, particularly in support of social issues. She encouraged her students to choreograph. In 1938, Bird was in need of a new accompanist and composer. In California, she was introduced to John Cage, the two found they shared an experimentalist bent, and he was hired. Cage, who also joined the faculty teaching composition, thrived in the company-oriented department, and the group produced a number of memorable works, such as Imaginary Landscape and 3 Inventories of Casey Jones. Cage made use of the creative energies of the department and its students to found a percussion orchestra and compose his first work for prepared piano. The situation at Cornish had become toxic, however, and led to the resignation of the school's founder, Nellie Cornish. In the aftermath of this, Bird was eased out of her leadership role. She left Cornish in the spring of 1940.

Bird had married Dr. Ralph Gundlach during her time at Cornish, a professor of psychology at the University of Washington. Gundlach had been a notable leftist before the war, and after, he found himself a target of the Canwell Commission, a local manifestation in Seattle of the Communist-purging House Un-American Activities Committee. Although Gundlach was not a Communist, he was one of three professors at University of Washington to be stripped of tenure and dismissed. The couple moved across the country where it was more likely they could find work.

In New York

In New York, she opened her Dance Drama School, which, though an artistic success, was not a financial one. Moving to the Young Men's and Young Women's Hebrew Association, Bird worked developing a dance program for young people with Doris Humphrey. At the YM-YWHA, she founded the children's company The Merry-Go-Rounders, which went on to great success and enticed a who's-who of the New York dance community to produce works for it. She was with the program until 1966. During her years in New York, Bird became involved in the running of the Dance Notation Bureau and co-founded the American Dance Guild and the Congress on Research in Dance (CORD).

In England at the Laban Centre

In 1973, Bird's work with Labanotation at the Dance Notation Bureau led her to request a visit by Marion North of the Laban Art of Movement Studio, which was then attached to Goldsmiths College of the University of London. The two formed an instant and lasting friendship. Later that year, Bird was invited to become principal lecturer at the institution charged with developing a "dance theatre department" at the Laban Centre. In 1977 and '78, the Council for National Academic Awards (CNAA) validated the dance theater Bachelor of Arts degree developed under the leadership of Bird and North. It was the first such degree in the United Kingdom. This was followed in 1981 by a pioneering MA degree in dance and in 1984 with doctorate degrees. Advances led by Bird and North in the academic realm were augmented by moves in dance performance. In 1982, a Dance Performance Course was set in motion to act as a bridge between dance school and the dance profession and to encourage young choreographers, with a performing entity at its heart, Transitions Dance Company. Furthering this work, friends of Bird celebrated her 70th birthday in 1984 by instituting the Bonnie Bird Choreography Fund, whose awards are known, after 2015, as "The Bonnies." Bird retired from Laban in 1989. A year later, in 1990, the CNAA awarded Bird a Doctor of Arts degree, honoris causa, for her work pioneering degree programs in dance in the UK.

In 2002 at the opening of the Laban Dance Centre in London's Creekside—seven years after her death—Bird was honored by the naming of the 300-seat main performance venue as the Bonnie Bird Theatre. In 2005, the Laban Centre merged with Trinity College of Music to become the Trinity Laban Conservatoire of Music and Dance.

== Personal life ==
Bird married Ralph Gundlach in Seattle Washington on May 19, 1938. Bird was 41 years of age when she gave birth to her first child, Heidi Gundlach in 1955. Scott Gundlach followed in 1957. The family later adopted Michael, the son of Gundlach's daughter from an earlier marriage, Joan. Bonnie Bird died in Tiburon, California, near San Francisco, on April 9, 1995.
