= Yuriko (dancer) =

American dancer and choreographer (1920–2022)

- Born: Yuriko Amemiya; February 2, 1920; San Jose, California, U.S.
- Died: March 8, 2022 (aged 102); Manhattan, New York, U.S.
- Other name: Yuriko Kikuchi
- Occupations: Dancer, choreographer
- Known for: Martha Graham Dance Company
- Spouse: Charles Kikuchi (m. 1946)
- Children: 2

Yuriko Kikuchi (née Amemiya, February 2, 1920 – March 8, 2022), known to audiences by her stage name Yuriko, was an American dancer and choreographer who was best known for her work with the Martha Graham Dance Company.

== Early life and career ==
Yuriko Amemiya was born to Chiyo (Furuya) Amemiya and Morishige Amemiya in San Jose, California in 1920, but her mother sent her to Japan in 1923 in order to escape an influenza epidemic in the United States that killed her father and sisters. At age six, she returned to California but was later left in Japan during a 1929 visit after her mother's second marriage ended. She began her dance training with Konami Ishii in Tokyo, and danced with the Konami Ishii Dance Company from 1930 to 1937. In 1937, Yuriko returned to the United States and joined Dorothy Lyndall's Junior Dance Company in Los Angeles.

== Internment ==
From 1941 to 1943, due to the signing of Executive Order 9066, Yuriko was interned along with other Japanese Americans at the Gila River War Relocation Center in Arizona, where she taught dance. She was released in September 1943, whereupon she immediately moved to New York City.

== Later career ==
Yuriko joined the Martha Graham Dance Company in 1944 and continued with the company for the next 50 years. She danced in the first production of Graham's masterpiece, Clytemnestra, as well as in Appalachian Spring, Cave of the Heart and Dark Meadow. She has also reconstructed a number of Graham's dances such as Primitive Mysteries.

In addition to her work in modern dance, Yuriko performed on Broadway in the original productions of The King and I (1951–54) and Flower Drum Song (1958–60) and directed the 1977-78 Broadway revival of The King and I.

On November 23, 1954, she acted in a Broadway play called Sandhog. In the musical, Yuriko alongside Eliot Feld, David Winters, Muriel Mannings, and Betty Ageloff played a group of kids. Paul Affelder of The Brooklyn Eagle praised all the performances, and found the kids talented.

She has also performed on television, and in motion pictures and danced to works by Halim El-Dabh and Eugene Lester. She taught famous dancers such as Mikhail Baryshnikov and Miki Orihara.

She formed her own modern dance company in 1967, which remained active until 1973.

Sources from the time frequently confuse this Yuriko with Japan-born Yuriko Kimura, who danced with the Martha Graham Dance Company from 1967 to 1985. Kimura joined the company a decade after Yuriko, and so they were often referred to as "Big Yuriko" (Kiguchi) and "Little Yuriko" (Kimura).

== Personal life ==
Yuriko married Charles Kikuchi in 1946 and had two children. She died in Manhattan on March 8, 2022, one month after her 102nd birthday.

== Awards ==
In 1967, she was awarded a Guggenheim Fellowship in choreography. In 1991, she won a Bessie Award. Yuriko was awarded an honorary doctorate from the Boston Conservatory in 2006.

Yuriko received the Martha Hill Dance Fund Lifetime Achievement Award in 2012.

== Films ==
- 1956 – The King and I
- 1957 – A Dancer's World
- 1960 – Yuriko: Creation of a Dance
