= Lamentation (ballet) =

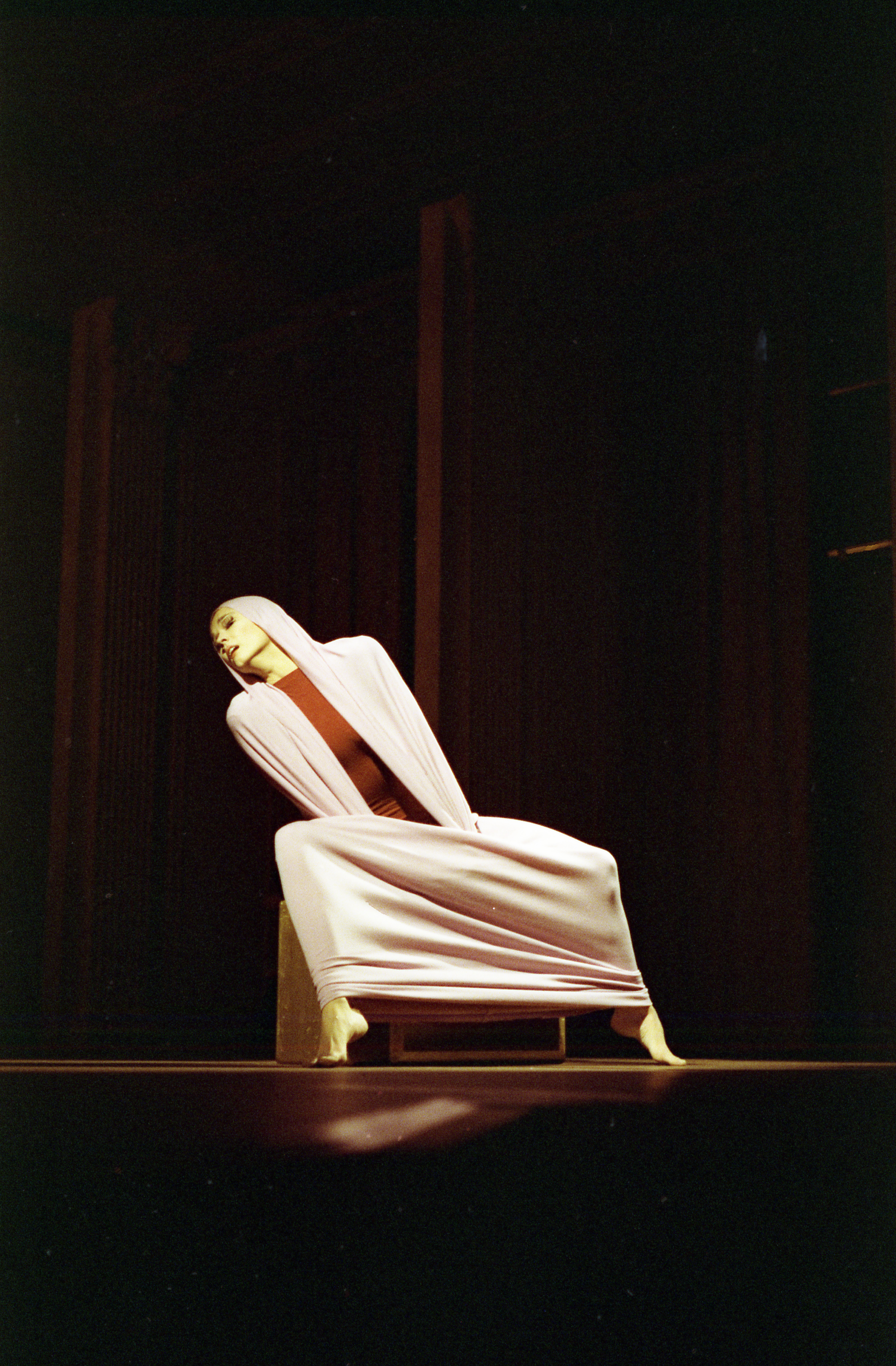
- Janet Eilber performing Lamentation in the East Room of the White House
- Choreographer: Martha Graham
- Music: Zoltán Kodály
- Based on: Book of Lamentations
- Premiere: 8 January 1930; Maxine Elliott's Theatre, New York City
- Genre: Modern dance

Lamentation is a modern dance solo choreographed by Martha Graham to Zoltán Kodály's 1910 Piano Piece, Op. 3, No. 2. One of Graham's signature works, it premiered on January 8, 1930 at Maxine Elliott's Theatre in New York City. The performance was part of a concert staged by the Dance Repertory Theatre, a group that included dancer/choreographers Doris Humphrey, Charles Weidman and Helen Tamiris. Their stated goal was "to give annually a season of continuous dance programs which will be representative of the art of dance in America and will give native artists an outlet for their creative work."

== Theme and structure ==
In program notes, Lamentation was subtitled Dance of Sorrow, "not the sorrow of specific person, time or place but the personification of grief itself." The ballet is less than four minutes in length. It opens on a set containing a single low bench upon which the soloist sits, feet and lower legs in a wide second position. She wears a loose purple tube-like garment from which only her head, hands and feet protrude. Graham said of the costume, "I wear a long tube of material to indicate the tragedy that obsesses the body, the ability to stretch inside your own skin, to witness and test the perimeters and boundaries of grief."

As the piece begins, the dancer shakes her head gently from side to side in silence. After cueing the music with a movement of her foot, she rocks and twists her upper body, swinging through deep contractions. The angular motions of torso, head and arms become increasingly exaggerated, shaping the jersey costume into squares, triangles and rhomboids that frame her emotionless face and a portion of her chest. Seemingly anchored to the bench, she ultimately struggles to an upright position. In a final gesture, she clutches the upper edge of her costume in an upraised fist, stretching the fabric tautly over her head and face. She sinks once again to a seated position and drops her head between her knees in resignation.

== Critical reception ==
Lamentation has been praised highly since its premiere. In 1930, the critic for Dance Magazine described the work as "a statuesque composition, which relied for much of its eloquence upon an ingenious and simple costume arrangement." After seeing a later performance, the Philadelphia Record's critic wrote, "When Miss Graham in her Lamentation depicts the dumb agony of grief she does not droop like a flower or attitudinize like Patience on a monument, she is grief from the first stricken bewildered gropings of her head and torso to the last moment when she averts her covered head with a finality that is pitiful and terrible."

== Critical analysis ==
Graham, her followers and critics have discussed Lamentation at length. It is one of the last dances made during what Graham referred to as her "long woolens" period, early works for which she costumed herself and female troupe members in stretch jersey. Graham scholars place the piece within her oeuvre of psychological expressionist ballets alongside Errand into the Maze, Night Journey, Dark Meadow and others.

Lamentation has been characterized as a total break with the conventions of dance at the time. Critic Marcia Siegel wrote, "Our idea of dancing includes some picture of a person on his feet." Not only is the work performed sitting down, the soloist is shrouded in constraining garb that not only limits her movements, but also hides her body from the audience. "What she achieved by restricting herself in this fashion was an unnaturally intense concentration on the body's dynamics."It's not just that she makes herself into an odd shape, but the minute she starts to move, the tube gets pulled into diagonals that cross the center of her body; as she tugs asymmetrically in opposition to the rounded forms of her back, her head, her arching rib cage, the jersey converts the energy of stress and distortion into visible shapes and lines."

Graham's inspiration for the piece reportedly came from the Old Testament Book of Lamentations, which begins "How doth the city sit solitary, that was full of people! How is she become as a widow." The work may also include New Testament references. The lone shrouded female figure bathed in blue stage lighting has been interpreted as a holy person, perhaps the Virgin Mary as Mater Dolorosa.

To dance writer Helen Thomas, the solo has a maternal quality that suggests "the struggle of birth" for both mother and child. As the dancer rocks and twists with knees apart, her arms and legs strain against the fabric to resemble fetal movement within a pregnant belly. She "is also the child being born: her limbs are encased in an elastic sheath; they push and stretch outward, straining toward release, with only the head visible."

== Performance history ==
Lamentation is one of a handful of early works that have remained in the Martha Graham Dance Company repertoire. Troupe members who have appeared in the piece include Janet Eilber, Christine Dakin, Terese Capucilli, Peggy Lyman, Joyce Herring, Katherine Crockett, Natasha M. Diamond-Walker and PeiJu Chien-Pott. Films of Graham performing were made in the 1930s, exact date unknown, and in 1943. A film of Peggy Lyman performing with an introduction by Graham was made for television in 1976. Ms. Diamond-Walker's performance was broadcast by New York City Center on October 21, 2020, remaining accessible through November 1, 2020.
