= Diversion of Angels =

1948 ballet by Martha Graham

Diversion of Angels, initially titled Wilderness Stair, is a Martha Graham ballet performed to an original score by Norman Dello Joio. The premiere on August 13, 1948, at the Palmer Auditorium in New London, Connecticut, included a set designed by Isamu Noguchi. It was eliminated at the second performance. Diversion of Angels is in the Martha Graham Dance Company repertoire and that of American Ballet Theatre (since 1999).

== Premieres and reception ==
Following the 1948 premiere, reviewer Frances Herridge described Wilderness Stair as a far cry from a significant addition to the Graham repertoire, being "without story or discernible comment" and lacking a performance by Graham. However, as an ensemble piece for the troupe, she thought it "superb."

On March 20, 1949, the dance was reintroduced with the title Diversion of Angels at the Eighth Street Theatre in Chicago. The New York premiere took place later on January 22, 1950 at the 46th Street Theater. For this performance, Yuriko replaced May O’Donnell.

== Theme and structure ==
Although the dance is story-less, Graham described it as a representation of three aspects of love. It may also be interpreted as three facets of one woman's character. Some Graham scholars claim the paintings of Wassily Kandinsky influenced the work.

The piece is staged for three couples and a corps de ballet. The women are costumed in yellow, red or white; the men, and corps members, are dressed in beige. The original performers were Helen McGehee and Stuart Hodes as Adolescent Love (yellow), Pearl Lang and Robert Cohan as Romantic Love (red) and Natanya Neumann and Mark Ryder as Mature Love (white). Dorothea Douglas, Joan Skinner, Dorothy Berea, Erick Hawkins, May O’Donnell and Dale Sehnert completed the cast. Romantic Love was renamed Erotic Love during the 1980s.

At the ballet's premiere, the program notes contained a Ben Belitt poem referencing the action, “It is the place of the Rock and Ladder, the raven, the blessing, the tempter, the rose. It is the wish of the single-hearted, the undivided; play after the spirit’s labor; games, flights, fancies, configurations of the lover’s intention; the believed Possibility, at once strenuous and tender; humors of innocence, garlands, evangels, Joy on the wilderness stair; diversion of angels.”

In comparison to much of Graham's oeuvre, the ballet is joyful, exuberant and lyrical.
