= May O'Donnell =

Dancer and choreographer

- Born: May 1, 1906; Sacramento, California
- Died: February 1, 2004 (aged 97); New York City, New York, U.S.
- Known for: Dance and choreography
- Movement: Modern dance

May O'Donnell (May 1, 1906 – February 1, 2004) was an American modern dancer and choreographer.

Born in Sacramento, California, May O'Donnell studied dance in San Francisco with Estelle Reed and performed in Reed's company before moving to New York City to study with Martha Graham. O'Donnell was a member of the Martha Graham Dance Company from 1932 until 1938.

In 1939, she returned to California and, with her husband, the composer Ray Green, and another former Graham dancer, Gertrude Shurr, founded the San Francisco Dance Theater. In 1941, O'Donnell joined creative forces with Jose Limon in a dance duo until 1942. She worked with the Graham Company again from 1944 to 1952 as a guest artist, at which time she created several roles notably the Pioneering Woman in "Appalachian Spring", Attendant in "Herodiade" (1944), She of the Earth in "Dark Meadow" (1946), and Chorus in "Cave of the Heart" (1946). In the mid-1940s she established the O'Donnell-Shurr Modern Dance Studio with Gertrude Shurr and continued the development of her own dance repertory.

Throughout her career O'Donnell created 50 documented dances, from 1937 to 1988. Notably, in 1943 O'Donnell choreographed a modern-dance classic, "Suspension", a thirteen-minute composition. The dance was inspired by her memory of seeing a plane below the hilltop on which she was standing in wartime California. That work was best explained, she felt, by T. S. Eliot's observation in Four Quartets that "At the still point of the turning world . . . . there the dance is." She often included T. S. Eliot's words in the program notes. In the piece, dancers moved slowly amid large boxes under a turning mobile.

O'Donnell retired from performing in 1961, but continued to choreograph through 1988.

O'Donnell was also an important teacher who counted Robert Joffrey, Ben Vereen, Cora Cahan, and Gerald Arpino among her students. She is known for an original dance technique that has influenced generations of modern dancers. In 1974 the May O'Donnell Concert Dance Company was formed and located at the May O'Donnell Modern Dance Center at 429 Lafayette Street in New York City. There, O'Donnell and her staff taught the May O'Donnell Dance Technique until the studio was sold in the 1980s.

O'Donnell died in Manhattan at the age 97 in 2004.

In 2005, her biography, May O'Donnell: Modern Dance Pioneer, was published by Marian Horosko.
