= El Penitente =

El Penitente is a modern dance work by Martha Graham performed to music by Louis Horst. It premiered on August 11, 1940, at the Bennington College Theater, Bennington, Vermont, with costumes by Edythe Gilfond and a set by Arch Lauterer. Isamu Noguchi later redesigned the set and created a new mask.

== Theme, structure and original cast ==
The ballet’s theme is taken from the Penitente religious traditions of the American Southwest in which believers expiate their sins through extreme penance, including mortification of the flesh. Its structure is derived from the mystery plays of the Middle Ages, in which small groups of traveling performers reenact scenes from the Bible. The original cast members were Graham as the Mary Figures (Virgin, Magdalene and Mater Dolorosa), Merce Cunningham as the Christ Figure and Erick Hawkins as the self-flagellating Penitent. In 1947, Graham relinquished the portrayal of Mary to Pearl Lang, marking the first time a "Graham" role was performed by anyone other than the star herself.

Horst's score for flute, oboe and piano is 20 minutes in length. The bold, stark and stylized choreography tells of piety and ecstasy in ten brief vignettes. The ballet opens with the entrance of a troupe of strolling players. Donning simple costumes, they present a primitive panorama of flagellation, revelation, temptation, contrition, crucifixion and redemption. The trio ends the performance in a joyful "festival" dance.

Through his motions, the Penitent embodies spiritual longing; he jumps, turns and whips himself in hopes of achieving union with God. The Christ figure moves stiffly, arms outstretched to strike cruciform poses and gestures of blessing or rebuke. The Mary figure presents a three-fold portrait: the tender virgin, the sorrowful mother, and the erotically writhing, then repentant, Magdalene.

The stage props are more literal than those used in most Graham works. They include a cross, which at times supports a sail-like square of cloth, another length of fabric carried by the Virgin Mary as a portable niche, a death cart representative of sin, and an apple/heart-shaped fruit proffered by the seductive Magdalene. Abstract masks and hoods are also employed to help define the characters.

== Critical reception ==
The work's premiere received mixed notices. New York Times critic John Martin noted, "It has a simple charm of form, telling its ancient tale with a ritualistic remoteness that is yet touched with humanity and a quiet beauty." Following a second viewing, Martin wrote, "Couched in a deliberately naive and oversimplified style of movement that is chiefly patterned pantomime, it achieves its ends with fine clarity and conviction." Walter Terry of the New York Herald Tribune called it "a beautiful ritual dance." Both reviewers praised the dancers' performances, particularly Graham's.

Not all reviews were as favorable. The New York Sun's critic wrote, "The work is as parched, dry and sunbaked as the locale of its origin and, despite the fine performances of Erick Hawkins, Merce Cunningham and Miss Graham, decidedly limited in its interest." A reporter for Dance Magazine described the work as "monotonous and unpalatable despite some fine dancing..."

== Performance history ==
Following its debut season, El Penitente was not performed again until 1947. The revival featured Pearl Lang in the role originally danced by Graham. John Butler replaced Merce Cunningham as the Christ figure, while Erick Hawkins recreated his role as the Penitent. Many critics found the revival lacking in intensity. The dance was subsequently dropped from the troupe's repertory.

In 1964, the piece was reconstructed for the American Dance Festival in New London, Connecticut. The performance was part of a program dedicated to Louis Horst and danced by David Wood, Marnie Thomas and Gene McDonald. The program also included the Horst-scored Graham ballets Primitive Mysteries and Frontier. El Penitente had not been in repertory for decades and Graham forbid notation of her dances. Seventeen dancers and the choreographer herself were needed to recreate the work. The dance was performed into the mid-1970s, then abandoned again.

In 1986, El Penitente was revived for a performance dedicated to Arizona State University's Centennial. Steve Rooks appeared as the Penitent, George White Jr. as the Christ Figure and Terese Capucilli as the Marys. During the first week of the Graham troupe's 1988 season, Mikhail Baryshnikov appeared as a guest artist in the penitent's role, alongside Joyce Herring as the Mary Figure and Pascal Rioult as the Christ Figure. In 1991, Baryshnikov reprised the role with the Graham company and with his own ensemble the White Oak Dance Project.

El Penitente has been staged relatively frequently since its 1986 revival. The work is part of the Martha Graham Dance Company's current repertoire.
