= Cave of the Heart =

Ballet choreographed by Martha Graham

Cave of the Heart is a one-act ballet choreographed by Martha Graham to music (Medea suite) by Samuel Barber. It was first performed on May 10, 1946, with the title Serpent Heart, at the second annual Festival of Contemporary American Music in the McMillin Theater of Columbia University. Serpent Heart was commissioned by the festival sponsor, The Alice M. Ditson Fund.

== Overview ==
The piece is loosely based on Euripides' tragedy Medea. The choreography is rich in Jungian symbolism, an important influence on Graham. According to the 1946 program notes, the work is “much like the myth of Jason, the warrior hero, and Medea, granddaughter of the sun…a dance of possessive and destroying love…” The four-person original cast included Graham as One Like Medea, Erick Hawkins as One Like Jason, Yuriko as The Princess and May O’Donnell as The Chorus. The set was designed by Isamu Noguchi, the costumes by Edythe Gilfond.

The ballet is approximately 28 minutes in length with seven movements/parts: Parados, Choros, Young Princess Dance and Dance of Jason, Choros, Medea's dance, Kanticos Agomas and Exodus (with fanfare of trumpets). The dance is part of Graham's “Greek Cycle,” which also includes Night Journey, a retelling of the Oedipus story, Errand into the Maze, and Clytemnestra, a ballet based on the Oresteia.The New York Times reviewer John Martin found the original ballet more of a draft than a finished work and thought the story missed the “force of the Medea myth, because here the Medea kills only the daughter of the king, who is her rival for Jason’s love…In the myth itself, she kills her own children in order to torture Jason, their father. There is almost too much wrath and passion here for so usual a denouement.” Martin deemed the music “brilliant” and the set “remarkable.”

The ballet was revised and renamed by Graham for the following season. Cave of the Heart was first performed on 27 February 1947, at the Ziegfeld Theater in New York. It featured the same cast but different character names: Graham as The Sorceress, Hawkins as The Adventurer and Yuriko as The Victim. The name of O’Donnell's character, The Chorus, remained the same. Graham invented one of her signature movements for the ballet, a step subsequently known as the "cave turn." The motion is a swooping heads-down spin in arabesque penché with a torso contraction.

John Martin critiqued the premiere of Cave of the Heart for the February 28 edition of the Times. He described the piece as “greatly strengthened” but added it would “probably never rank among the masterpieces of the Graham repertoire.” Graham's ballet begins well into the myth, when abandoned by Jason and exiled from her home, The Sorceress (Medea) plots revenge on her husband and her rival. Inflamed by jealousy, she murders the princess, Jason's new wife, and kills her own two children. Donning a metal garment of flame-like spikes, she becomes symbolically trapped in a prison of her imagining.

Cave of the Heart was one of Graham's favorite dances. Despite the anti-heroine's dark and brutal nature, the piece is ultimately a tale of transformation, as The Sorceress, cleansed by fire, returns to her father the Sun. Cave of the Heart is still in the Graham Dance Company repertory. It is one of the troupe's most enduring ballets and is considered a classic. The documentary film An Evening of Conversation and Dance with Martha Graham includes Cave of the Heart, as well as Errand into the Maze (1947) and Acts of Light (1981).
