= Errand into the Maze =

1947 ballet by Martha Graham

Errand into the Maze is a Martha Graham ballet based on a poem by Ben Belitt set to music by Gian Carlo Menotti. The surrealistic set was designed by Isamu Noguchi, the costumes by Graham herself. The dance uses the Greek myth of Ariadne and the Minotaur to explore the theme of conquering one's inner demons, more specifically the fear of sexual intimacy. The piece premiered at the Ziegfeld Theatre on February 28, 1947, with Graham as the protagonist, a sort of female Theseus, and Mark Ryder as the Minotaur-like character.

Errand into the Maze is one of Graham's best-known and most popular ballets. It remains in the Martha Graham Dance Company repertory. Deborah Jowitt's 2024 biography of Graham takes its title from this work.

== Plot ==
The original program notes describe the action as "that errand-journey into the maze of the heart to face and do battle with the Creature of Fear". Barely fifteen minutes in length, Errand into the Maze is designed almost as a solo work, with the bull-horned, staff (bone)-carrying Creature of Fear serving more as a prop than an active participant.

The unnamed female protagonist weaves her way through a rope maze outlined on the stage to arrive at a set (originally by Isamu Noguchi) that includes a suggestive v-shaped wooden frame (like a tree, or a woman's crotch). She is confronted three times by the creature, ultimately overpowering him. He drops the bone/staff as he sinks to the floor in surrender. The heroine dances in the void between the two vertical set elements as the curtain falls.

== Primary dancers ==
When the piece premiered in 1947, the primary dancers were Martha Graham and Mark Ryder. They performed a revised version the next season, and received better reviews. When Graham once again danced Ariadne in 1952, she was accompanied by Stuart Hodes. They continued to perform the piece together over the next few seasons.

When the Batsheva Dance Company of Israel was founded by Graham and Baroness Batsheva de Rothschild in 1964, the revival of Errand into the Maze was danced by Rina Schenfeld and Moshe Efrati. Yuriko Kimura and Tim Wengerd were the primary dancers of the piece in the 1970s. In the 1980s, the piece was danced first by Terese Capucilli and Larry White and then by Christine Dakin and Mario Comacho.
