= Christine Dakin =

American dancer

Christine Dakin, the Daughter of James I Crump and Jean Coulter Crump, was born August 25, 1949 in New Haven. She is an American dancer, teacher and director, and a foremost exponent of the Martha Graham repertory and technique.

== Performances ==
Dakin is known for her performances of Ms. Graham's roles and for those created for her by Martha Graham and artists such as Robert Wilson, Twyla Tharp and Martha Clarke. She performs and produces works created for her by contemporary choreographers Brice Mousset, Alejandro Chavez, and Jaime Blanc. She is a guest performer with Sokolow Theatre/Dance Ensemble, American Dance Guild, and Audrey Ross Dances. Performing in the principal theaters of the world, partnered by renowned artists such Rudolf Nureyev, and filmed in the repertory, she was chosen by Graham for the company in 1976. Dakin became an Associate Artistic Director in 1997 and was named Artistic Director with Terese Capucilli in 2002. Leading the company to its rebirth, they are credited with bringing the artistic excellence and repertory of the Company to a level not seen since Martha Graham’s death.

== Awards ==
Dakin was honored by the dance community with a “Bessie” Performance Award (2003) and the Dance Magazine Award (1994), was a Fulbright Senior Scholar (1999), and recipient of two Rockefeller-US-Mexico Fund for Culture grants (1998, 2001) for choreography, research and teaching. She was awarded the 14th annual Labat Loano Grand Prix “Giuliana Penzi” 2015 Career Award, and the Dance Ambassador Award (2023) from Mark De Garmo Dance. At Harvard University she was the Evelyn Green Fellow at the Radcliffe Institute for Advanced Study (2007/08), Visiting Lecturer for the Faculty of Arts and Sciences (2006, 2009) offering the university’s first credit course in dance, and was the “Learning from Performers” guest artist (2001). Educated at the University of Michigan, Ms. Dakin is the recipient of the University of Michigan Alumni Award (2001), an Honorary Doctor of Arts from Shenandoah University (2001), and an Honorary Doctorate from the Universidad de Colima, Mexico (2007).

== Academic career ==
On the faculty of The Juilliard School since 1993, she is currently faculty at The Neighborhood Playhouse School of the Theater, the Alvin Ailey American Dance Theater School in New York, guest teacher at Alvin Ailey American Dance Theater, Ailey II, and is known internationally as a teacher and guest artist; since 1981 maintaining a special relationship with the Mexican dance community as teacher, and choreographer with the Ballet Nacional de México, Universidad de Colima’s Ballet Folklórico de México (Dir. Rafael Zamarripa) and contemporary company Univerdanza, Universidad de Veracruz, Xalapa, Centro de las Artes Sn. Luis Potosí, Compañía de Danza Contemporánea de Yucatán, Universidad Autónoma de Monterrey, and Invernadero Danza Oaxaca (Dir. Rosario Ordóñez). Guest performer with Compañía Ciudad Interior (Dir Alejandro Chávez), ‘choreographic guide’ at Encuentro de Creación Coreográfica EnTiempoReal2017. Her choreography in collaboration with Mexican composers and scenic designers has premiered in Mexico City and the International Festival at St. Luis Potosí.

Dakin has written and directed a film, La Voz del Cuerpo/The Body Speaks, her personal poetic of Martha Graham's dance; with an international collaboration of dancers and musicians. The film explores the work and creative life of a dancer and was official selection in 2013 of New York City Independent Film Festival and Golden Door International Film Festivals, NewFilmmakers New York 2014, and has been shown at the 92Y in New York, the Museum of Contemporary Art in Oaxaca, Mexico and for International Day of Dance UNESCO in Barcelona. Her video, Terpsikon Vol 1: fundamental sequences of Martha Graham’s technique is available on Vimeo on Demand.

She is dancer and founding member of Buglisi Dance Theatre (1993), of danz.fest (Italy 2008) and Invernadero Danza (Mexico 2009). She teaches also with Tecniche de Danza Moderna (Dir. Caterina Rago) and Graham for Europe (Dir Rafael Molina). With Radcliffe Institute colleague, physicist Z. Jane Wang, Dakin has investigated with artists and scientists of the "dancing leaf group": "Locomotion/Emotion; perception of complex movement and the dynamics of beauty" in a 2009 Harvard Radcliffe Seminar; and "The Dynamics of Beauty: Human Perception of Complex Movement" in 2011.
