= Sophie Maslow =

American dancer (1911–2006)

Sophie Maslow (March 22, 1911 – June 25, 2006) was an American choreographer, modern dancer and teacher, and founding member of New Dance Group. She was a first cousin of the American sculptor Leonard Baskin.

Born and raised in Manhattan's Upper West Side by Russian American parents, Sophie Maslow began her dance training with Blanche Talmud at the Neighborhood Playhouse School. Her teachers there included Martha Graham and Louis Horst. She became a member of Martha Graham's Company in 1931, performing many solo roles, until 1943. She created her own dance troupe, The Sophie Maslow Dance Company and, with Jane Dudley and William Bales, established the Dudley-Maslow-Bales Trio in 1942. Ms. Maslow helped to define and establish New Dance Group as a performance entity dedicated to using dance to make social and political statements. In 1948, she performed and was a faculty member at the first American Dance Festival held at Connecticut College.

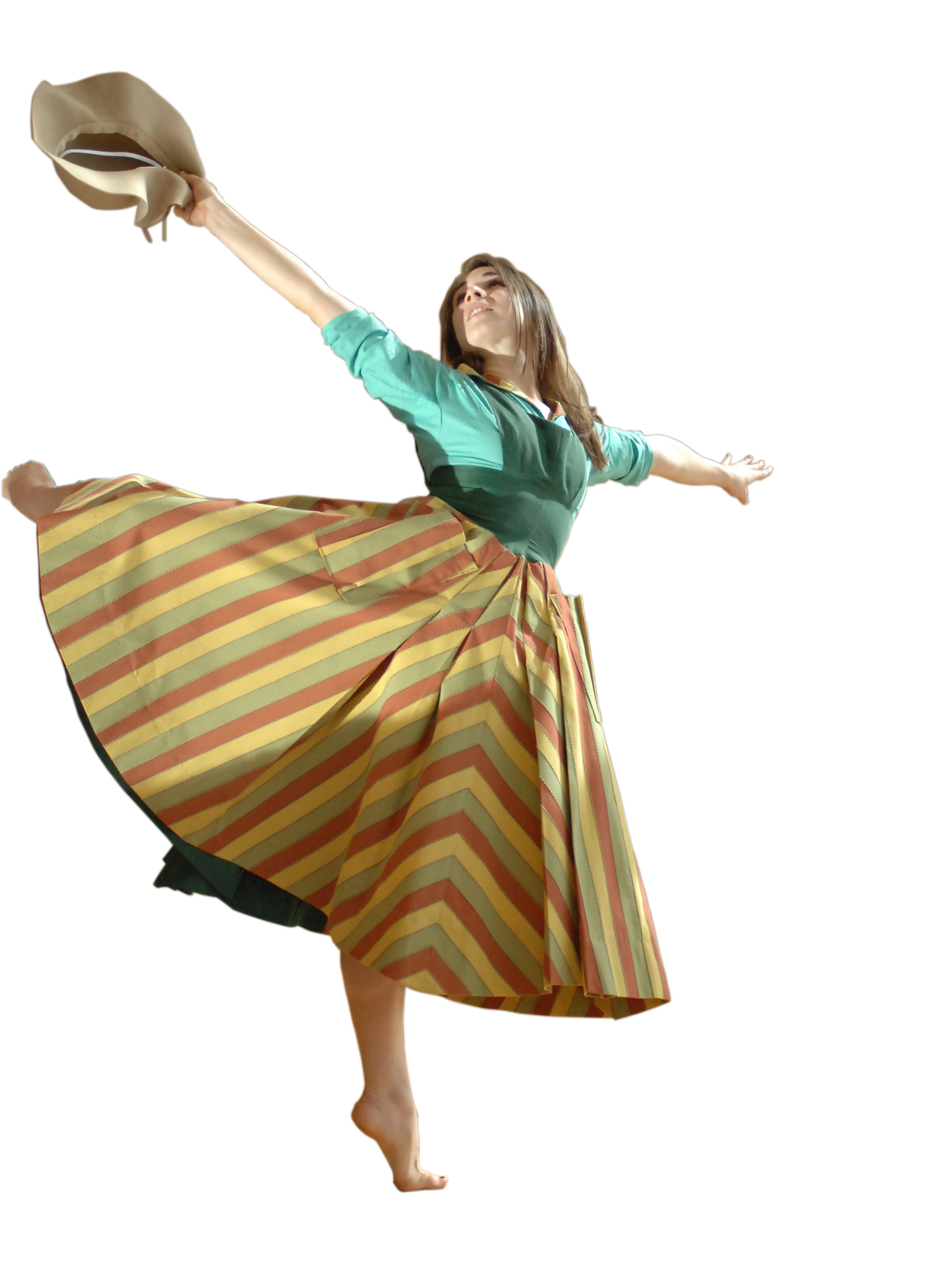
Dust Bowl Ballads by CityDance Ensemble

Maslow's choreography includes: "Dust Bowl Ballads" which depicted the Depression of the 1930s and the people of the Southwest's endurance during these droughts, "Folksay" based on Carl Sandburg's poem of the same name, "Poem," with music by Duke Ellington and words by Lawrence Ferlinghetti, and the off-Broadway musical "The Big Winner" about a poor tailor and his winning lottery ticket. In 1951, she choreographed for the New York City Opera (The Dybbuk). In 1952, 1955, 1956, and 1960–62, Maslow choreographed the Hannukkah Festivals held at Madison Square Garden.

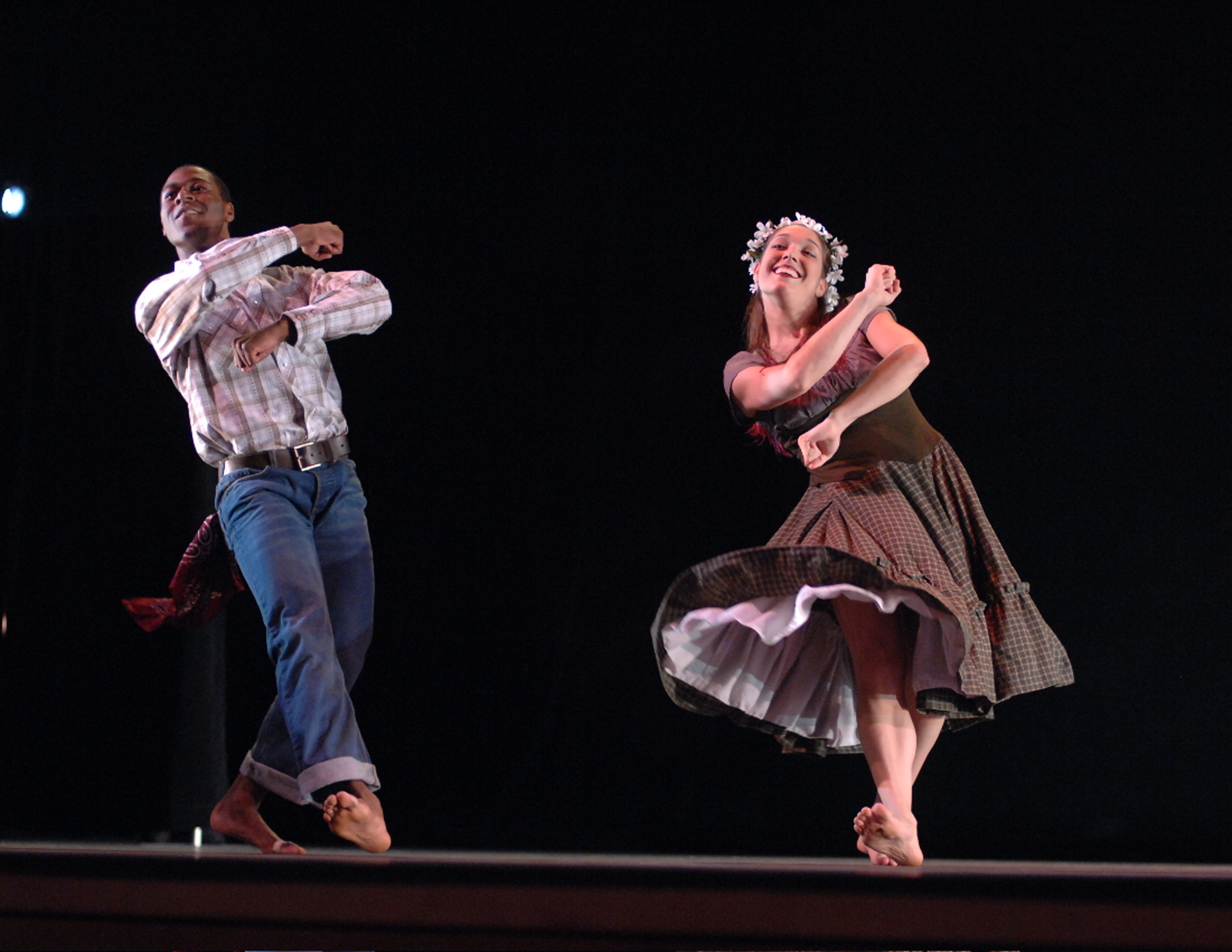
"Folksay" by CityDance Ensemble

Her dances have been reconstructed and performed by CityDance Ensemble, The Harkness Ballet, The Batsheva Dance Company, and The Bat-Dor Company. Sophie Maslow's voice and altruism remain an inspiration for New Dance Group Arts Center.

Maslow was Jewish.

She died on June 25, 2006, in Manhattan at age 95.

== Selected choreographic works ==
- Themes from a Slavic People (1934) music: Béla Bartók
- Two Songs About Lenin (1934)
- May Day March (1936)
- Runaway Rag (1938)
- Silicosis Blues (1939)
- Dust Bowl Ballads (1941) music: Woody Guthrie
- Sarabande (1941)
- Melancholia (1941)
- Exhortation (1941)
- Gigue (1941)
- Bourée (1941)
- Folksay (1942) music: Woody Guthrie, spoken text: The People, Yes by Carl Sandburg
- Llanto (1944)
- Champion (1948) music: Samuel Matlowsky
- The Village I Knew (1950)
- Four Sonnets (1951)
- Snow Queen (1952)
- Suite:Manhattan Transfer (1953)
- Israel in Dance and Song (1953)
- Celebration (1954)
- The Gentleman from Cracow (1955)
- Anniversary (1956)
- Prologue (1959)
- Poem (1963) music: Duke Ellington, poem by Lawrence Ferlinghetti
- The Dybbuk (1964)
- In the Beginning (1965)
- Innovacation of David (1966)
- Ladino Suite (1969)
- Country Music (1971)
- Touch the Earth (1973)
- Decathlon Etude (1976)
- Voices (1980) music: Robert Schumann
- Woody Sez (1980) music: Woody Guthrie
- From Louis' Book (1985) [music-bach]
