= Land Be Bright =

Land Be Bright is a modern dance work choreographed by Martha Graham to music by Arthur Kreutz with a set and costumes by Charlotte Trowbridge. The unabashedly patriotic piece premiered on March 14, 1942, at Chicago's Civic Opera House. The original cast included Graham and members of the Martha Graham Dance Company.

== Theme, structure and original cast ==
The ballet's program notes describe the work as, "A 'celebrating' for Washington's birthday, Lincoln's birthday, Jefferson's birthday."

The action unfolds in five sequences, three solos and two ensemble dances, based on square dance forms. The original cast members were:

- Anthem, Chorus of Americans - Ethel Butler, Jane Dudley, Jean Erdman, Nina Fonaroff, Elizabeth Halpern, Pearl Lack (Pearl Lang), Sophie Maslow, Marjorie Mazia
- Hymn, Betsy Ross - Martha Graham
- Greeting, Chingachgook - Erick Hawkins
- Oration, Yankee - Merce Cunningham
- Square Dance

A quotation from Vachel Lindsay was included in the program, "This is somewhat in the spirit of statehouse and courthouse and dollar bill mural paintings. It is somewhat in the spirit of the best Fourth of July decorations and speeches, and the way patriotic people remember their heroes in fancy and oratory."

== Critical reception ==
Land Be Bright was roundly panned by reviewers. One critic reported that the work received "little more than polite applause. The Chicago Sun's reviewer quipped, "From where I sat Land Be Bright had exactly nothing to say." The worst notices came from Music News, whose critic called the work "uninspired and infantile in conception" with "the worst faults of the early modern dance."

Dance Magazine's Ann Barzel had a more favorable opinion and even saw a possibility for Graham to rehabilitate the work. "Land Be Bright at its premiere was a routine modern dance, not any more distinguished than the square dance pieces most modern dance groups include in their repertoires. Somehow we feel that this will not be true for more than a few performances. Miss Graham will soon find what she is after and lift Land Be Bright from its undistinguished level to something outstanding - or she will drop it."
