= Appalachian Spring =

1944 ballet by Martha Graham and Aaron Copland

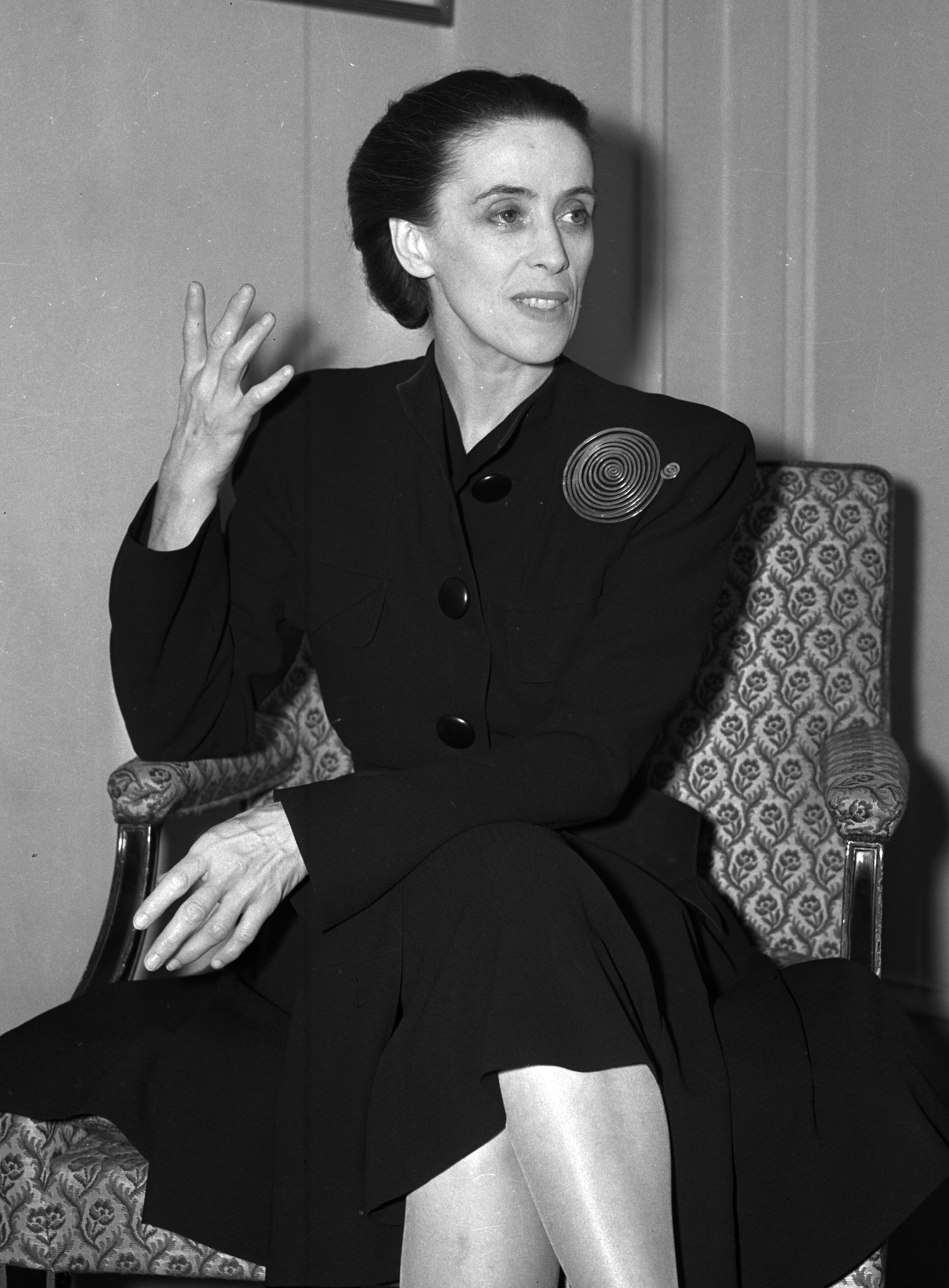
- Martha Graham, c. 1940
- Choreographer: Martha Graham
- Music: Aaron Copland
- Premiere: October 30, 1944; Coolidge Auditorium
- Original ballet company: Martha Graham Dance Company
- Characters: The Bride; The Husbandman; The Pioneer Woman; The Revivalist
- Design: Sets by Isamu Noguchi; Costumes by Edythe Gilfond
- Setting: 19th-century Pennsylvania
- Created for: Martha Graham; Erick Hawkins; May O'Donnell; Merce Cunningham
- Genre: Modern dance

Appalachian Spring is an American ballet created by the choreographer Martha Graham and the composer Aaron Copland, later arranged as an orchestral work. Commissioned by Elizabeth Sprague Coolidge, Copland composed the ballet music for Graham; the original choreography was by Graham, with costumes by Edythe Gilfond and sets by Isamu Noguchi. The ballet was well received at the 1944 premiere, earning Copland the Pulitzer Prize for Music during its 1945 United States tour. The orchestral suite composed in 1945 was played that year by many symphony orchestras; the suite is among Copland's best-known works, and the ballet remains essential in the Martha Graham Dance Company repertoire.

Graham was known for creating the "Graham technique" of dance; in the 1930s, she began commissioning scores from various composers, often related to American history and culture. Around the same time, Copland incorporated relatable and accessible musical characteristics of the Americana style to increase his music's appeal to the general public; he first implemented this in earlier ballets like Billy the Kid and Rodeo. The initial scenario for Appalachian Spring devised by Graham was revised many times by both her and Copland; the title characters' names were changed numerous times and other characters from the early revisions were cut in the final production. Originally orchestrated for a thirteen-piece chamber orchestra, the score was arranged into various suites by Copland for different purposes; the original ballet featured eight episodes, three of which were cut in the well-known orchestral suite.

The ballet takes place in a small Appalachian settlement in 19th-century Pennsylvania. There are four main characters: the Bride, the Husbandman, the Pioneer Woman, and the Revivalist; the last is accompanied by four Followers. (Note: The names of these characters were later changed (see § Production).) Appalachian Spring follows the Bride and the Husbandman as they get married and celebrate with the community. Themes of war are present throughout the story; it is suggested that the Husbandman leaves for war, causing worry and anxiety among the community. Shaker themes also influenced the ballet, notably in the music, where Copland incorporated a theme and variations on the common Shaker tune "Simple Gifts".

== History ==
=== Background ===
During the late 1920s and early 1930s, Aaron Copland spent much of his time promoting American composers and music. Copland's compositions during this time turned jazzy and dissonant, a style that interested few. During the Great Depression, his left-wing political stances strengthened, motivated by addressing the concerns of ordinary people. This initiated the idea of music that was simple and accessible enough to be liked by the general public, a concept pioneered in his opera for children The Second Hurricane (1937) and his greatly successful ballet El Salón México (1936). This "ordinary music" idea is present in Appalachian Spring; Copland remarked in a 1980 interview that the music was "plain, singing, comparatively uncomplicated and slightly folksy. Direct and approachable". The composer solidified his populist and Americana style with ballets like Billy the Kid (1938) and Rodeo (1942), both of which used cowboy songs and fit with the popular stereotypes about the Wild West. In addition, Lincoln Portrait (1942) and Fanfare for the Common Man (1942) received widespread acclaim for their American themes, distinguishing Copland's versatility as a composer.

Martha Graham was a modern dancer and choreographer best known for creating the "Graham technique" of dance. The Martha Graham Dance Company originally consisted of only women due to Graham's feminism; this played a key role in productions like American Document (1938), which mixed important moments in American history with Native American themes and American folklore. In the 1930s, she began commissioning scores from various composers; the scenarios often involved American history and culture.

=== Commission and writing ===
In 1941, Graham proposed to Copland a dark ballet about the Greek mythology figure Medea; despite being a great admirer of Graham, he declined. The following year, Erick Hawkins, the chief male dancer in Graham's dance company, convinced the music patron Elizabeth Sprague Coolidge to commission a ballet from Copland for Graham's company; Copland happily accepted the offer. Graham first proposed a scenario titled "Daughter of Colchis", which was inspired by the story of Medea but set in 19th-century New England. Copland found it "too severe", and the idea was given to another Coolidge commissionee, Carlos Chávez. In May 1943, Graham sent Copland a scenario titled "House of Victory", about a newlywed couple in a small 19th-century Pennsylvania settlement. Copland revised the scenario before composing the music, though his occupation with the score for The North Star caused the beginning of his work to be delayed.

Per Coolidge's commission, the orchestra was to be no bigger than twelve musicians. Copland originally planned to orchestrate it for double string quartet and piano, but later decided to add a double bass, flute, clarinet, and bassoon, a scoring similar to Chávez's work. During the 1940s, Copland spent much of his time on the West Coast scoring Hollywood films; as a result, he composed the music for Appalachian Spring far from Graham's East Coast-based work. Since he could not meet with Graham, he relied greatly on the various scenarios sent to him. In total, Copland was sent three scripts: the original "House of Victory", and two revisions titled "Name". In composing the music, he drew from all three scripts to devise his own scenario, which Graham planned around as she received various drafts of the score. Copland used the working title "Ballet for Martha" during the composition process.

The original scenario, "House of Victory", used characters based on common American archetypes and was set during the Civil War, but also drew from Greek mythology and French poetry. (Note: In the final scenario, the exact time period is left ambiguous to the entire 19th century.) Four main characters were present: the Mother, who represents the preindustrial American; the Daughter, a brave pioneer; the Citizen, a smart civil rights advocate who marries the Daughter; and the Fugitive, who embodies the slave in the Civil War. Graham based some of the ballet on her own experiences. She grew up in small-town Pennsylvania, and later wrote that the Mother was based on her own grandmother. Other characters include the Younger Sister, Two Children, and Neighbors. In the later revisions, a new character was added: a Native American girl to represent the land, associated with the story of Pocahontas. The Native American girl was meant to act as a theatrical device, interacting with everyone in the ballet without being acknowledged, but the idea was scrapped in Copland's final composition. Additionally, Graham planned for the Mother to speak excerpts from the Book of Genesis throughout, "not in a religious sense so much as in a poetic sense"; this too was cut by the premiere.

The final scenario featured eight episodes: (Note: See Crist (2005, p. 168) for a table comparison of differences between the "Name" scripts and the final Appalachian Spring scenario.)

1. Prologue: Graham did not want this opening episode to be long; she wanted it to have "a sense of simple celebration". As the lights went up, the Mother observed her land.
2. Eden Valley: The Daughter and the Citizen dance together in a "duet of courtship".
3. Wedding Day: Graham divided this episode into two parts. The first opens with a dance between the Younger Sister and the Two Children. The Citizen exhibits his strength before carrying the Daughter into the couple's new home. In the second part, the Daughter and the Citizen dance a love scene in the home, while those outside celebrate in an "old fashion charivari".
4. Interlude: This episode depicts daily life in the town during spring planting.
5. Fear in the Night: The central conflict of the ballet begins in this episode. The Fugitive enters with an "awkward" and "tragic" solo, bringing forth the fear and suffering of the Civil War.
6. Day of Wrath: This episode was intended to represent the tragedies of war, accompanied by music reminiscent of the Civil War. The Citizen dances a violent solo "reminiscent of Harper's Ferry and John Brown" while the Two Children play a war game.
7. Moment of Crisis: The women of the town gather, their behavior suggesting "a barely suppressed hysteria".
8. The Lord's Day: The final scene was intended to depict "Sabbath in a small town". The Daughter and the Citizen perform a love duet outside the home, and the rest of the community attends a revival meeting.

The "House of Victory" script included an extra episode after the "Interlude" presenting scenes from Uncle Tom's Cabin, strengthening the ballet's connection to the Civil War; but, upon Copland's persuasion, Graham cut the episode from the revisions. In addition, the original script used a different final scene, where the Daughter and the Citizen reunite in the home. The second script ended with "the town settling down for the night" and the Daughter standing at the fence just before the curtain falls. The third script put forth "The Lord's Day" as it would stand in the final scenario.

Graham received half of the score in January 1944 and began work on the choreography. Copland completed the condensed score in June 1944, and the orchestration was finished in August. The premiere was originally set to take place at the Library of Congress on October 30, 1943, which was Coolidge's birthday. By May 1943, Copland had not begun composing the ballet, and given the further problems introduced by World War II, the premiere was postponed to early 1944. Despite a new December 1943 deadline for the music, a completed score was still not in view, and the premiere was pushed to late 1944.

=== Production ===
Isamu Noguchi's set

Shortly before the premiere, Graham decided upon the title "Appalachian Spring". (Note: Copland turned "Ballet for Martha" into the subtitle of the work.) It was taken from the cycle of poems The Bridge (Note: The bridge in question is the Brooklyn Bridge in New York.) by Hart Crane, an American poet also seeking to create unique American art; one of the poems, titled Powhatan's Daughter, contained the line "O Appalachian Spring!" Crane's work was a great inspiration to Graham while she wrote the various scripts.

To construct the set, Graham hired Isamu Noguchi, a sculptor and common collaborator with the company. While planning, she took Noguchi to the Museum of Modern Art and showed him Alberto Giacometti's sculpture The Palace at 4 a.m. (Note: See a picture of the statue at the Museum of Modern Art's website.) as a reference for what she wanted: something depicting the inside and outside of a house without actually dividing it, a sort of blurred mix. Noguchi's use of an outline of a house served as a metaphor for the general idea of the work being about "the bone structure of a people's living". The set featured the outline of a house, part of a porch with a ledge, a rocking chair, a small fence, and a tree stump (serving as the Revivalist's pulpit). Edythe Gilfond created the costumes and Jean Rosenthal designed the lighting.

Many changes were made to the scenario after the score was finished. The Younger Sister, the Two Children, and the Neighbors were all cut, and the rest of the cast was renamed: the Daughter to the Bride; the Citizen to the Husbandman; the Mother to the Pioneer Woman; and the Fugitive to the Revivalist. (Note: For the sake of consistency, this article will use these new names from now on.) Four Followers of the Revivalist were added to the cast for a total of nine dancers in the ballet. The choreography often deviated from both the final scenario and Copland's annotations in the score; for example, the closing love duet between the Bride and the Husbandman became a dance between the Revivalist and his four Followers. Regardless, Copland was not irritated by this, later commenting, "That kind of decision is the choreographer's, and it doesn't bother me a bit, especially when it works." The cast at the premiere starred Graham as the Bride, Hawkins as the Husbandman, May O'Donnell as the Pioneer Woman, and Merce Cunningham as the Revivalist. Yuriko, Pearl Lang, Nina Fonaroff, and Marjorie Mazia danced the Revivalist's followers.

Graham's performance was young and lively, which critics praised. On the contrary, Hawkins was stiffer and exhibited the masculinity of the role, but later performers were more supple with movements. Cunningham, who choreographed his own solo during "Fear of the Night", was instructed to display great anger; Graham later described the role to a new dancer as being "ninety-nine percent sex and one percent religion: a real popular spellbinder, a magnetic man who had power over women." Graham's vision for the four Followers was spontaneity; they would remain perfectly still until their time came, and when they did dance, it would be with energy and focus. Agnes de Mille, fellow choreographer and close friend of Graham's, pointed out that many subsequent productions featured cute and perky Followers, but that this was not Graham's original intention. Much of the contrast between female and male characters was intentional. While the female characters remained bouncy and light, the male characters were stiff and took up much space.

The press described the choreography as simple and precise. Despite being set during such a scenario, the choreography does not explicitly depict a wedding; rather, the dance expresses the emotions of individual characters. This non-literal plot allowed for free emotional interpretation by the audience. The Bride's movements featured quick patterns that stayed within an imaginary box around her. This contrasted with the Revivalist's strict posture and the flowing movements of the Pioneer Woman. One reviewer pointed out the solitude of the characters and its manifestation in their movements, writing, "The separateness of still figures... which their poses emphasize, suggests that people who live in these hills are accustomed to spending much of their time alone."

=== Initial run and reception ===
Appalachian Spring premiered on October 30, 1944, at the Coolidge Auditorium, conducted by Louis Horst, the music director of the company. (Note: Appalachian Spring premiered alongside two other Coolidge commissions: Hérodiade, set to music by Hindemith, and Imagined Wing, set to music titled Jeux de Printemps by Milhaud.) The premiere was the closing concert of a four-day chamber music festival honoring Coolidge's 80th birthday. Copland had not attended any of the rehearsals at Graham's request, first seeing the full performance a day before the premiere. The ballet was well-received by critics and the public. The New York Times critic John Martin wrote of the music, "Aaron Copland has written a score of fresh and singing beauty. It is, on its surface, a piece of early Americana, but in reality it is a celebration of the human spirit." The Dance Observer critic Robert Sabin wrote of the story, "Appalachian Spring works outward into the basic experiences of people living together, love, religious belief, marriage, children, work and human society." The dance was also praised; Martin continued, "There is throughout the work a very moving sense of the future, of the fine and simple idealism which animates the highest human motives." The dance critic Walter Terry praised Graham in particular, writing in 1953, "Miss Graham brought to the role a wonderful radiance which dominated the entire ballet." The group of dancers was commended for being well-trained and enthusiastic. Copland's idea for ordinary music continued to be popular; one reviewer commented that it was "comprehensible even to the bored businessman". Copland himself had a modest opinion of the premiere; a week later, he wrote in a letter: "People seemed to like it so I guess it was all right."

The great demand for tickets caused a repeat of the October 30 program to occur the following evening. Shortly after the premiere, the Graham Company took Appalachian Spring on tour across the United States with the same cast. The debut show of the tour took place in Washington, D.C., on January 23, 1945. The New York premiere of the ballet occurred days after Victory in Europe Day; the ballet's American populist themes, combined with Copland winning the Pulitzer Prize for Music in the same week, caused this show to be even more successful. After every performance sold out, the New York run was extended by one night.

=== Later performances ===
Appalachian Spring remains an essential production in the Martha Graham Dance Company repertoire. Due to the high cost of licensing, the ballet was not performed by another company until 1998, when the Colorado Ballet staged it led by artistic director Martin Fredmann. In 2013, the Baltimore School for the Arts put on a production for the "Appalachian Spring Festival" in association with the Graham Company, which featured a complete performance of the ballet and various art exhibits. It marked the first time a non-professional company was granted permission from the Martha Graham Center to perform the ballet. Appalachian Spring has been performed by numerous dance companies since, including the Onium Ballet Project in Hawaii, the Nashville Ballet in Tennessee, Dance Kaleidoscope in Indiana, and the Sarasota Ballet in Florida.

Many consider Appalachian Spring one of Copland's best works; it holds equal notability in the Graham company's repertoire. The critic Terry Teachout wrote, "It is probably the greatest piece of classical music composed by an American. Certainly the greatest dance score composed by an American, completely comparable in quality to the great ballets of Tchaikovsky or Stravinsky. All that is best about mid-century American music is in this piece." In addition, the ballet was essential to the development of modern American ballet; it and Copland's other Americana works represent the leftist national ideals important to the postwar era, but use traditional themes, steering away from the outwardly political works of many New York artists at the time. Lynn Garafola compared Copland and Graham's collaboration to that of Stravinsky and Diaghilev; whereas Stravinsky composed purely Russian scores for Diaghilev's Ballets Russes, Copland composed American music for Graham's company, helping define American dance.

== Themes ==
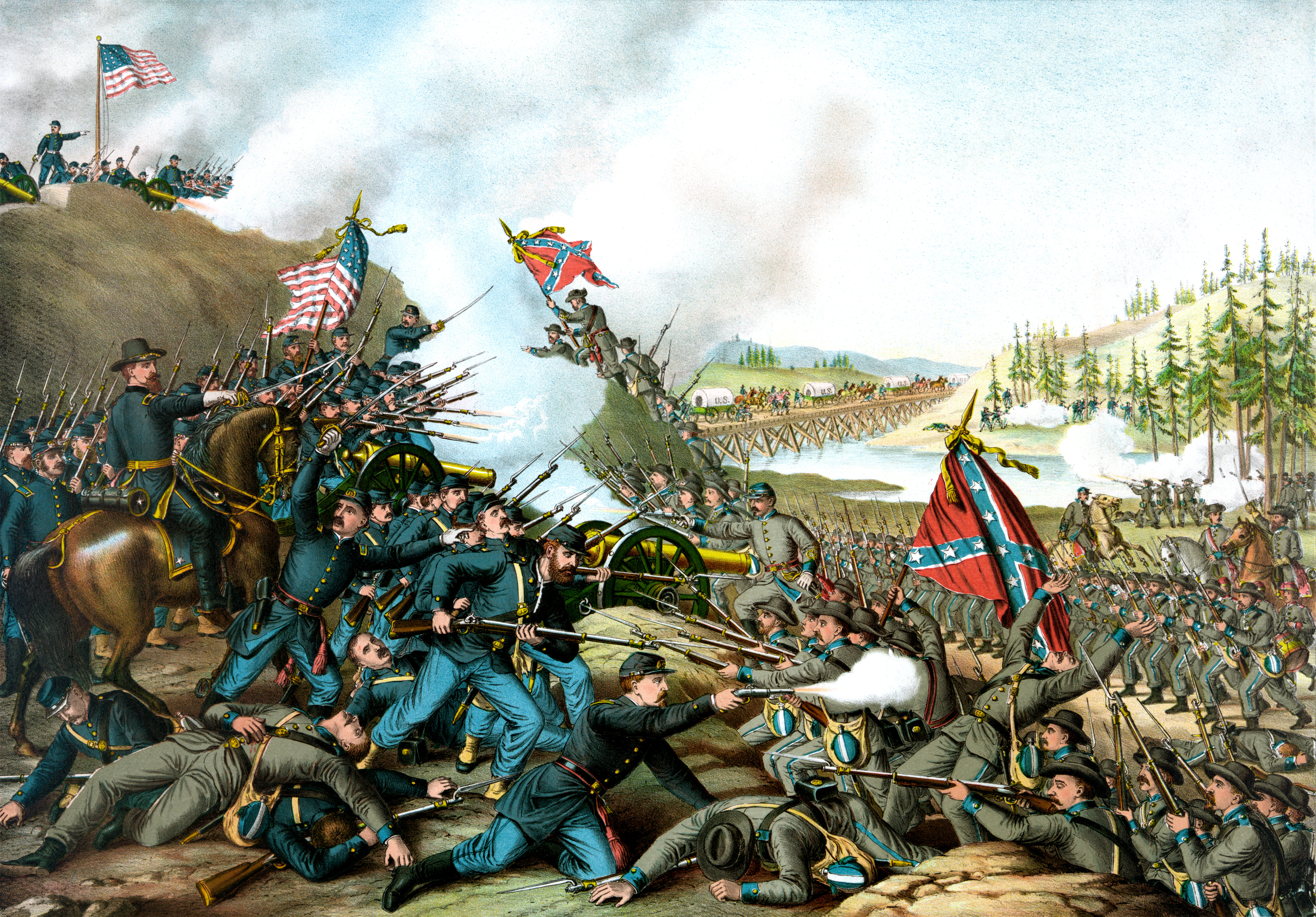
Themes of war, particularly the American Civil War, are present throughout Appalachian Spring.

Themes of war are present throughout the conflict of Appalachian Spring. The central conflict begins in the "Fear in the Night" episode, where the Revivalist delivers a haunting sermon. Howard Pollack argued that this scene represented the spirit of John Brown's raid on Harpers Ferry, something that could cause the Husbandman to be drafted in the Civil War. Furthermore, the subsequent "Day of Wrath" episode can be seen as the Husbandman leaving for war, depicted with waves of goodbye. "Moment of Crisis" is an expression of anxiety and concern for the Husbandman, and "The Lord's Day" is a prayer for peace and safety. When the Husbandman rejoins the Bride at the end, Pollack suggests this is actually in her imagination, further supported by her final gesture of reaching out to the horizon. Dance historian Mark Franko argues that the Civil War themes are possibly a reference to the civil rights movement and ongoing racial inequality in the United States.

The opening of the music uses delicately placed dissonances to create a dreamy landscape. In the scripts Copland worked from, this scene was to feature the Pioneer Woman sitting "terrifyingly still" and looking over her land. Elizabeth Crist speculates that the entire ballet is the Pioneer Woman's memory; Crist suggests that the dissonances in the music depict the Pioneer Woman reflecting on the hardships she faced, and that the following episodes are entirely her own experiences. Crist continues that when the opening themes are recalled at the end of the ballet, the Bride disconnects from the Pioneer Woman's memory, becoming her own individual memory; the Bride sits where the Pioneer Woman sat at the beginning, the context having shifted to a new time. Crist describes this as an embodiment of the link between wars among generations: as the youth during World War II saw similar circumstances to the generation of the Civil War, the Bride represents the common experiences of people living on the homefront during the 19th and 20th centuries. Graham's explanation for this was the fluidity of time, where younger generations feel the ramifications of things the older generations experienced.

Shaker themes are also heavily present in Appalachian Spring. This idea is found in the original "House of Victory" script, where the Pioneer Woman is said to sit in a "Shaker rocking chair". Copland's interest in Shakers was not new, as they became a common subject of American art during the Great Depression. After Copland included the Shaker tune "Simple Gifts" into the "Interlude", Graham added "The Lord's Prayer" as a possible "Shaker meeting". (Note: In her 1991 autobiography, Graham actually claimed that she heard the tune in a cathedral and asked Copland to include it in Appalachian Spring.) Copland had decided to use "Simple Gifts" early on; by extracting a basic melodic motif from the tune, he created variations on it throughout the composition, first referring to it in the opening measures. The lyrics of "Simple Gifts" are connected to the ballet's themes of peace and remembrance during wartime: "'Tis the gift to be simple, 'tis the gift to be free".

== Instrumentation ==
The original ballet and subsequent suite for chamber orchestra are scored for:

Woodwinds

1 flute
1 clarinet in B♭
1 bassoon

Percussion

piano

Strings

2 first and 2 second violins
2 violas
2 cellos
1 double bass

The suite for orchestra and ballet arrangement for orchestra are scored for:

Woodwinds

2 flutes (second doubling piccolo)
2 oboes
2 clarinets in B♭
2 bassoons

Brass

2 horns in F
2 trumpets in B♭
2 trombones

Percussion

timpani
glockenspiel
xylophone
cymbals
triangle
claves
woodblock
bass drum
snare drum
tambourine
piano

Strings

violins I, II
violas
cellos
double bass
harp

== Music and plot ==
=== Prologue ===
The ballet opens with a soft, quiet A major triad in the clarinet. The cello sustains the A tonic while the flute, violin, and viola stack build the A major triad again, this time with the dominant chord (E major) stacked on top. This creates a luminous scenescape, but the dissonances foreshadow danger. Copland conjures images of a pastoral scene by ending the chords with a deep tonic in the piano and following it with a shepherd flute-like reiteration of the triad. This opening polychord, consisting of the tonic A major and dominant E major, is found throughout the score as a foundation for many of the melodies and tonalities. The Revivalist enters first, in darkness, followed by the Pioneer Woman, who takes a seat in her rocking chair. Then the Husbandman and Bride enter; as the Husbandman pauses to observe the home, daylight illuminates the stage. The four Followers join the Revivalist, who has observed the land with the Pioneer Woman. The two-minute opening has set up the themes present throughout the ballet, and Copland employed the upwards building of chords to depict a "nonmilitant fanfare", as Graham described in the early scripts.

=== Eden Valley ===
An allegro melody bursts forth as the Daughter bounds from inside the home. The melodies of "Eden Valley", meant to express the Bride's joy, use elements of an "old-fashioned swing" described in the early scripts. The new melody is followed by a bouncy restatement of the polychord from the "Prologue". A chorale-like second theme is introduced alongside the first. This chorale features odd rhythms between the different voices; while the upper line emphasizes the second beat, the bass line accents the first and third beats. The music calms down to a moderato; as the Husbandman enters, jagged rhythms show his awkward movement, but it is twice interrupted by the gentle chorale.

As the two back out of the home, the couple dances a duet, this time accompanied by a new, more forceful theme in the strings. A descending melodic line is contrasted with the chorale theme; this connection of themes is seen throughout the episode and was used by Graham to easily shift the characters. The two receive the blessings of the Pioneer Woman and the Revivalist. This section is reminiscent of the Cowgirl's music from Rodeo, or the soft parts of Lincoln Portrait for the love theme; near the end, the clarinet brings back the chorale, and the flute answers, a call and response between the Bride and the Husbandman. Throughout the episode, the Followers participate in various group solos; the group often features a "spiraling" motion, moving into a kneeling position. "Eden Valley" closes with the Followers returning to the bench, each taking a seat one by one. Illustrating the choreography's close connection to the music, the moment each Follower sits is cued by a short motif in the woodwinds.

=== Wedding Day ===
A playful, childlike melody springs from the clarinet, opening the first part of "Wedding Day" and signifying the start of festivities. Graham wanted the first part to have "a little sense of a County Fair, a little of a revival meeting, a party, a picnic"; Copland achieves this by relating the music to square dancing and fiddling. The music becomes heavier and the jagged rhythms return for the Husbandman's Davy Crockett-esque solo; the love theme returns in the calmer music as the Husbandman carries the Bride into the home. The second part of "Wedding Day" depicts the "old fashion charivari" mentioned in the scripts. The joyous and bouncy music uses scales and rhythmic jolts to conjure the image of party and celebration. The Bride dances a rhythmically complex solo, similar to the Husbandman's dance in the first part. Instrument sections are clearly divided by quick jumps through changing metres. The uneven rhythms are replaced by consistent eighth notes, starting a light presto; here, Stravinsky's influence on Copland is evident in the Petrushka-like ascending and descending scales. As the music calms down with a restatement of the chorale, the Revivalist dances with his Followers before the full cast proceeds onstage. A reprise of the calm opening (marked as at first) follows the characters as they exit for a walk; the light focuses on the Pioneer Woman's face, then fades into darkness as "Simple Gifts" begins.

=== Interlude ===
Copland used the Shaker song "Simple Gifts" throughout much of Appalachian Spring, first playing it in its entirety at the start of the "Interlude". In the "Interlude", four variations on "Simple Gifts" are introduced, some fitting the atmosphere of the action on stage (like one variation reminiscent of the clip-clop of a horse's hooves). Most of the variations leave the melody essentially the same, changing other elements of the music, such as the harmony and instrumentation. This technique was meant to depict the lives of various townspeople doing their daily rounds, while the Husbandman and the Bride dance joyfully. The two are strongly connected throughout the duet, signified by eye contact, ease of physical touch, and openness of the body. Partway through, the Revivalist and his Followers join in. The Revivalist solos in close alignment with the bassoon, accompanied by the Followers. During the half-speed fourth variation played as a canon in the woodwinds, the Revivalist dominantly watches the couple's high-spirited duet, and follows them as they walk into the home.

=== Fear in the Night, Day of Wrath, Moment of Crisis ===
The music of "Fear of the Night" nervously jolts and twitches, like the "Gun Battle" in Billy the Kid. Fragmented "stingers", as Fauser called them, make the fast section the most "filmic" part of Copland's score. The Revivalist takes off his hat and approaches the bowing Husbandman and Bride. His Followers surround him as he warns the couple of their eventual separation due to the war. His agonized, frenzied dance was informed by the "dark" experiences of Peter Sparling, a dancer in the company who danced the role in later productions; his emotional interpretation influenced future dancers of the role. The Revivalist's solo uses violent shaking to relate the dance to traditional Shaker festivities; the shaking travels throughout the body, like a spirit trying to escape the body. The demonstration scares the Bride and sends her into turmoil, but she quickly rejoins the Husbandman and accepts the risks of her love.

In "Day of Wrath", Copland was "riffing rather aimeously of the arpeggiated polychord of the opening ... strengthened by an elusive displacement of the beat", Fauser wrote. The Pioneer Woman enters with deep anger, and after prayer, she enters the home. The Husbandman leaves the home and performs a leaping solo, where the music uses a distorted version of the A major "Wedding Day" music stacked atop B minor harmonies to evoke anguish as he waves goodbye and exits.

The Bride opens "Moment of Crisis" by frantically running across the stage, and the other women join in an anxious frenzy. The music becomes rushed and agitated into perpetual motion; consistent sixteenth-note patterns jump around the orchestra, with no sense of musical direction. The tonality is unstable and different from the common tonal language used in the rest of the score. The music begins to calm and the chorale returns as the Husbandman briefly comes back to dance with the Bride. Another variation of "Simple Gifts" underlines the Husbandman's slow drift away, and a grand, final restatement of the Shaker tune signals the end of the fear as the Pioneer Woman dances with the Followers.

=== The Lord's Day ===
A gentle hymnlike melody, marked "like a prayer", is heard in the strings as the community gathers for prayer. The chorale is stated a final time, followed by the return of the opening theme. Graham wrote that this episode "could have the feeling of a Shaker meeting where the movement is strange and ordered and possessed or it could have the feeling of a negro church with the lyric ecstasy of the spiritual about it". The Bride dances her final solo and finishes by putting her hand to her lips and then reaching out to the sky. The Husbandman returns and holds her briefly, but the Revivalist comes and touches his shoulder. As the music from the "Prologue" returns, the Bride sits in the rocking chair that the Pioneer Woman sat in and she looks over the empty stage. The Husbandman rests his hand on her shoulder and the Bride reaches out at the clarinet's last note. The music slowly fades to silence on the opening polychord and the curtain falls.

== Suites ==
In May 1945, Copland arranged the ballet into a suite for a symphony orchestra, and many conductors programmed the work in the following seasons. The suite for orchestra premiered in October of that year with the New York Philharmonic Orchestra conducted by Artur Rodzinski, and was well-received. Other American orchestras expressed interest in the suite, with the San Francisco Symphony Orchestra, Pittsburgh Symphony Orchestra, Kansas City Philharmonic Orchestra, and the Cleveland Orchestra scheduling it that season. Its great success made the (then on-tour) ballet even more popular, establishing Copland and Graham as highly regarded artists. The Vienna premiere of the orchestral suite took place in November and the Australian premiere soon after. In January 1946, the Martha Graham Dance Company presented a new run of shows in New York, including Appalachian Spring on the program. By May 1946, the orchestral suite had received performances across the world.

The orchestral suite is divided into eight sections, named by their tempo markings instead of episode titles in the ballet: "Prologue", "Eden Valley", "Wedding Day", "Interlude", and "The Lord's Day". In the suites, Copland omitted the conflict of the story ("Fear in the Night", "Day of Wrath", and "Moment of Crisis"), making these episodes unfamiliar to the public and seldom recorded. The popularity of the orchestral suite led to a number of other arrangements, including an arrangement of the full ballet for orchestra in 1954 and an arrangement of the "Simple Gifts" variations for band and later orchestra (1956 and 1967, respectively). In total, five versions of Appalachian Spring exist as created by Copland; listed in chronological order: the original ballet for 13 instruments, the suite for orchestra, a revised version of the ballet for 13 instruments, the revised ballet for orchestra, and the suite for 13 instruments. The orchestral suite remains the most well-known.

== Recordings ==
The first recording of Appalachian Spring was of the orchestral suite: the 1945 premiere of the suite by the New York Philharmonic Orchestra was recorded and reissued in 1999. The ballet for full orchestra was first recorded by the Philadelphia Orchestra in 1954, and Columbia Records released it four years later. The first recording of the original ballet was made in 1990 by Andrew Schenck and Hugh Wolff. In 1958, a film of the ballet was made with Graham in the lead role and Stuart Hodes dancing the Husbandman. The film was financed by WQED, who had already produced one successful Graham film. Nathan Kroll, a musician who had a good understanding of the score, directed the film and consulted Louis Horst (the conductor of the premiere) to ensure the music was just as Copland wanted. Another version was made in 1976 for WNET's Dance in America film series, with Yuriko in the leading role. The choreography of both versions remained close to the original. As of 2023, there are over 150 available commercial recordings of Appalachian Spring.

== Notes and references ==
=== Sources ===
- Copland, Aaron (2000). Appalachian Spring (score). Boosey & Hawkes.
- Copland, Aaron; Perlis, Vivian (1984). Copland 1900 Through 1942. New York: St. Martins/Marek. ISBN 978-0-312-16962-6.
- Copland, Aaron; Crist, Elizabeth B.; Shirley, Wayne (2008). The Selected Correspondence of Aaron Copland. New Haven: Yale University Press. doi:10.12987/9780300133479. ISBN 978-0-300-11121-7. JSTOR j.ctt1nq05k.
- Crist, Elizabeth (2005). Music for the Common Man: Aaron Copland During the Depression and War. Oxford: Oxford University Press. ISBN 978-0-19-538359-1.
- de Mille, Agnes (1991). Martha: The Life and Work of Martha Graham (1st ed.). London: Hutchinson. ISBN 978-0-09-175219-4.
- Fauser, Annegret (2017). Aaron Copland's Appalachian Spring. Oxford Keynotes. New York: Oxford University Press. ISBN 978-0-19-064687-5.
- Franko, Mark (2012). "2. Politics Under Erasure: Regionalism as Cryptology". Martha Graham in Love and War: The Life in the Work. Oxford: Oxford University Press. pp. 45–65. ISBN 978-0-19-977766-2.
- Graham, Martha (1991). Blood Memory. New York: Doubleday. ISBN 978-0-385-26503-4.
- Oja, Carol J.; Tick, Judith, eds. (2005). Aaron Copland and His World. Princeton: Princeton University Press. ISBN 978-0-691-12470-4.
- Philip, Robert (2018). "Aaron Copland (1900–90)". The Classical Music Lover's Companion to Orchestral Music. New Haven: Yale University Press. pp. 182–190. ISBN 978-0-300-24272-0.
- Pollack, Howard (1999). Aaron Copland. New York: Henry Holt and Company. ISBN 978-0-8050-4909-1.
- Pollack, Howard (2013). "Aaron Copland". Grove Music Online (8th ed.). Oxford University Press. doi:10.1093/gmo/9781561592630.article.A2249091. ISBN 978-1-56159-263-0. (subscription, Wikilibrary access, or UK public library membership required) (subscription required)
- Robertson, Marta (Spring 1999). "Musical and Choreographic Integration in Copland's and Graham's 'Appalachian Spring'". The Musical Quarterly. 83 (1). Oxford University Press: 6–26. doi:10.1093/mq/83.1.6. JSTOR 742256.
- Ross, Alex (2007). The Rest Is Noise: Listening to the Twentieth Century (1st ed.). New York: Farrar, Straus and Giroux. ISBN 978-0-312-42771-9.
- Rutkoff, Peter M.; Scott, William B. (October 1995). "Appalachian Spring: A Collaboration and a Transition". Prospects. 20. Cambridge University Press: 209–225. doi:10.1017/S0361233300006062.
- Stodelle, Ernestine (1984). Deep Song: The Dance Story of Martha Graham. London: Schirmer Books. ISBN 978-0-02-872520-8.
- Thomas, Helen (1995). "Appalachian Spring". Dance, Modernity and Culture: Explorations in the Sociology of Dance. London: Routledge. ISBN 978-0-415-08793-3.
