= Stuart Hodes =

American dancer (1924–2023)

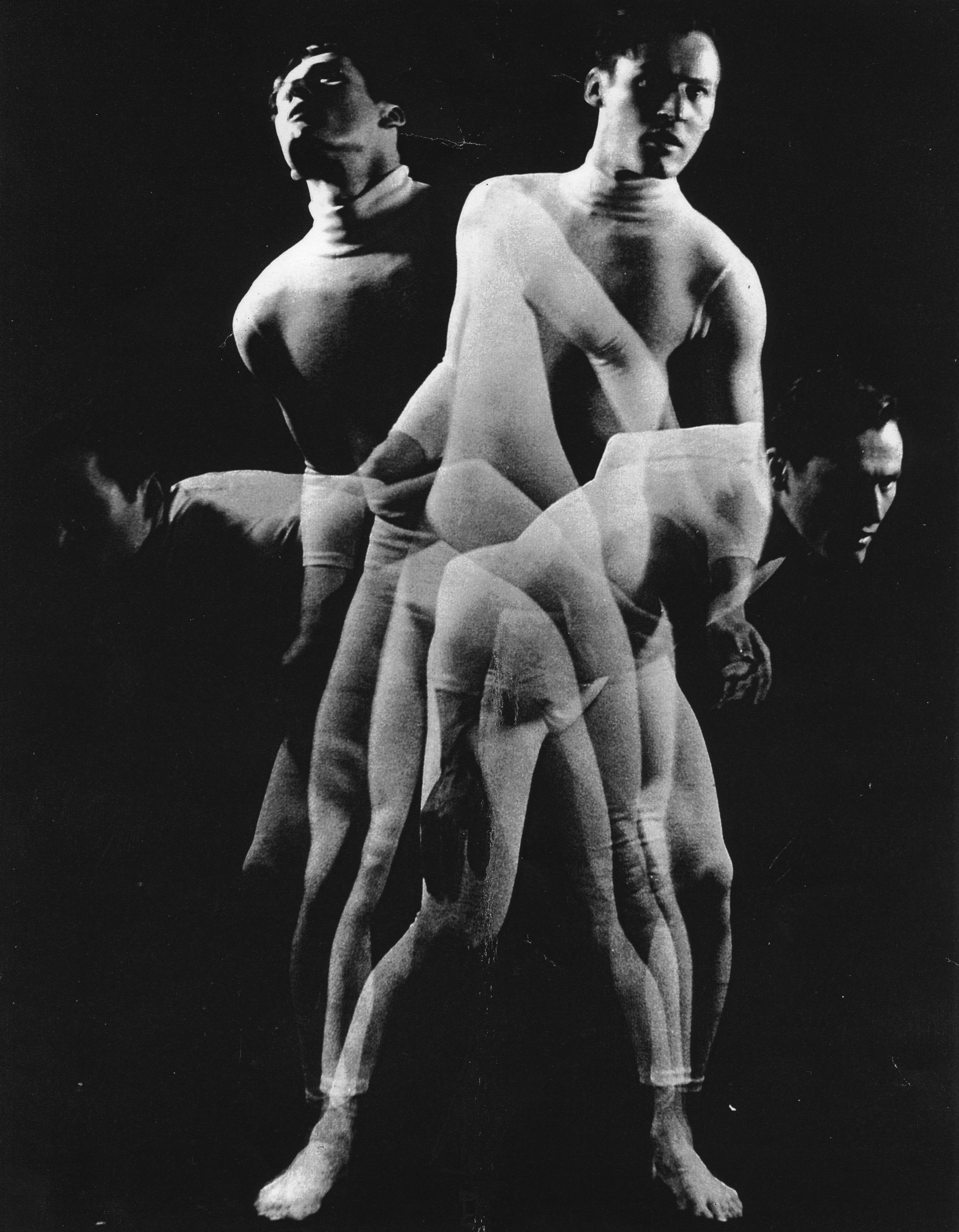
- Stuart Hodes by Alfred Gescheidt
- Born: Stuart Hodes Gescheidt; November 27, 1924; New York City, New York, U.S.
- Died: March 15, 2023 (aged 98)
- Occupations: Dancer; choreographer; educator; author

Stuart Hodes (November 27, 1924 – March 15, 2023) was an American dancer, choreographer, dance teacher, dance administrator and author. He was Martha Graham's partner, danced on Broadway, in TV, film, in recitals, and with his own troupe. His choreography has appeared on the Boston Ballet, Dallas Ballet, Harkness Ballet, Joffrey Ballet, San Francisco Ballet and other troupes. He taught at the Martha Graham School, Neighborhood Playhouse, NYC High School of Performing Arts, headed dance at NYU School of the Arts and Borough of Manhattan Community College. He was Dance Associate for the NY State Council on the Arts, dance panelist for the National Endowment for the Arts, president of the National Association of Schools of Dance, and a member of the First American Dance Study Team to China in 1980, returning in 1992 to teach the Guangzhou modern dance troupe.

== Early life ==
Stuart Hodes Gescheidt was born in New York City in November 1924 and grew up in Flushing, Miami Beach, and Sheepshead Bay. His older sister was writer Malvine Cole, and his younger brother was photographer Alfred Gescheidt. He attended PS 98, Brooklyn Technical High School, and Brooklyn College, entered the army in 1943, served in the Army Air Forces. Trained as a B-17 pilot, he flew seven bombing missions before VE Day, then, attached to the Military Air Transport Command, flew troops from Naples to Marrakesh. Reassigned to the Army of Occupation, he began flying reporters for an unofficial Army newspaper, The Foggia Occupator. Discharged as a second lieutenant in June 1945, he joined the Air Force Reserve for four more years. His first civilian job was publicity director for the Bennington (Vermont) Drama Festival, before re-entering Brooklyn College, leaving when offered a dancing job by Martha Graham.

== Dance performance ==
Hodes had started taking modern dance classes at the Martha Graham School with no thought of dance as a career until invited to join Graham's troupe for a U.S. tour in December 1946, followed by 3 weeks at the Ziegfeld Theater. He committed to dance in fall, 1947, adding daily ballet classes at the School of American Ballet. He spent 1947 through 1958 with the Martha Graham Dance Company. Among his roles was Adolescent Love (Yellow) in Diversion of Angels, Creature of Fear in Errand into the Maze, Husbandman in Appalachian Spring, Seer in Night Journey, Dark Beloved in Deaths and Entrances, Brother Fire in Canticle for Innocent Comedians, Mad Tom in Lear, Highwayman in Punch and the Judy, and as one of the three male roles in (Theatre for a) Voyage.

Graham dancers were not paid for rehearsals so for income, Hodes taught and danced on Broadway, TV, and night clubs. He was in the original casts of Do Re Mi, First Impressions, Milk and Honey, Paint Your Wagon, Peer Gynt, Sophie, The Barrier, To Broadway with Love, Ziegfeld Follies (1956 edition), and the City Center revival of Annie Get Your Gun. He was a replacement in Kismet, By the Beautiful Sea, Once Upon a Mattress, The King and I and The Most Happy Fella. On TV he danced The Wild Horse in Annie Get Your Gun, swam with Esther Williams as her counter in The Esther Williams AquaSpectacle, also Buick Circus Show, The Milton Berle Show, and specials such as Satins and Spurs, Stingiest Man In Town, Cinderella, The American Cowboy and others. He danced with younger choreographers including, DJ McDonald, Claire Porter, Stephan Koplowitz, and Gus Solomons, Jr. In 1985, he performed in Kathy Acker's The Birth of the Poet, directed by Richard Foreman in the Brooklyn Academy of Music's Next Wave Festival.

From 1992 through 1996, he and his wife, Elizabeth Hodes, created and toured their one and two-person musical shows, traveling nationwide in Dancing on Air with Fred Astaire, La Musique de Piaf, Kurt Weill—Berlin to Broadway, Our Marlene (Marlene Dietrich), The Sound of Wings (Amelia Earhart), A Woman's World, Two Americans in Paris, and others. Elizabeth performed The Sound of Wings, written by Hodes based on the life of Amelia Earhart. In 2000 and 2001, they performed a two-person musical The O’Tooles Tonight!, written by Gayle Stahlhuth, and presented at the East Lynne Theater in Cape May, NJ.

== As choreographer ==
Hodes’ choreographic debut at the 92nd Street YM-YWHA in 1951 included FLAK, a solo based on World War II bombing missions, Surrounding, Unknown, and No Heaven in Earth, original score by Eugene Lester. He opened Dancer's Studio in 1952, a space used by other choreographers including Merce Cunningham and Robert Joffrey. He choreographed for the San Francisco Ballet, Santa Fe Opera, St. Louis Municipal Opera, Boston Ballet, Dallas Ballet and Cologne Opera Ballet. Dances include After the Teacups (1963), Abyss (1965), Prima Sera (1968), and A Shape of Light (1974). Hodes was commissioned by ChoreoConcerts, curated and produced by Laura Foreman, the New School's dance director. Domaine (1974), was a gentle teasing of F.M. Esfandiary, a transhumanist philosopher on the New School faculty. Beggar's Dance (1975), a duet with Susan McGuire to J.S. Bach and Longfellow's Hiawatha. Boedromion (1974), for the George Faison Universal Dance Experience. Other dances include Dance Lessons (1977) a trio for himself, Sara Hook and Kenneth Tosti, Brush (1982), a solo for Argentine dancer, Claudia Florian, White Knight, Black Night (1984) a duet with his daughter Catherine. I Thought You Were Dead, a duet co-choreographed and danced with Alice Teirstein, was named one of Ballet Review’s ten best dances of 1996.

== Work as a dance educator, administrator ==
After leaving the Graham troupe in 1958, Hodes continued to teach at the Graham School, also NYC's High School of Performing Arts, The New School, New York University, Manhattan Community College and as guest in many American colleges. He was a guest teacher in Toronto, London, Copenhagen, Zurich, also in China and Russia. In 1966, he joined Harkness House for Ballet Arts where he created young audiences dance shows performed at Hunter College and NYC Public Schools. In 1968, he founded his own young-audience troupe, The Ballet Team, which toured nationally, and in 1969, became Dance Associate for the New York State Council on the Arts (NYSCA) at the start of its grant-making Aid to Cultural Organizations project. In 1972, he joined New York University's School of the Arts (later Tisch) as head of Dance, during which time he served as a Dance Panelist for the National Endowment for the Arts (NEA). In 1983, he was asked to join the First American Dance Study Team to China. In 1985, he became director of The Kitchen, an avant garde arts presenter, which was deeply in debt. He brought about sale of its commercial co-op loft in SoHo and secured its present multistory Chelsea building. In 1987, he became Associate Professor Dance Coordinator at the Borough of Manhattan Community College, and in 1989, Executive Director of the Dance Notation Bureau.

Former students include Joan Finklestein, head of the Harkness Foundation for Dance, Stephanie Skura, American choreographer and teacher, Aydin Teker, major choreographer from Istanbul, and Anne Teresa De Keersmaeker, whose groundbreaking FASE was first shown in a studio at NYU School of the Arts.

== Graham vs. Graham ==
In 2000, Francis Mason, president of the Martha Graham Center board of directors, asked him to become Head of School. In 2001, Ronald Protas, Graham's heir, formed the Martha Graham Trust and sued the Martha Graham Center for the rights to all her dances, her dance technique, and use of her name. Hodes testified in five of the six trials. Judge Miriam Goldman Cedarbaum for the U.S. District Court of the Southern District of New York ultimately ruled that 54 of the disputed dances belonged to the Center, ten were in the public domain and one, Seraphic Dialogue, was owned by Protas. All trademark claims brought against the Graham Company and Center were dismissed. Hodes’ personal account of the trials, titled, Graham Vs. Graham: The Struggle for an American Legacy, is unpublished but digital copies are in the Graham archives and New York Public Library.

== Writing ==
Hodes began writing as a child. His first job after army discharge was writing publicity for the Bennington Drama Festival, a summer theater. Famed literary agent Audrey Wood read his story In the Chorus Room, said it was a chapter of a novel and that if he wrote four more chapters and an outline, she'd get him an advance. It became the novel Dumbdancer, not completed until after he'd stopped dancing, and which remains unpublished. Martha's Advanced Class, describes Graham's technique class as experienced by someone taking it. Sybil Shearer Dances appeared in Ballet Review. Other articles appeared in Performing Arts Journal, Design for Arts in Education, and other publications. A Map of Making Dances (Ardsley House, 1998) is a choreographer's workbook with (247) experimental movement projects. Part Real-Part Dream: Dancing with Martha Graham (Concord ePress, 2011), a memoir, gives an account of his life, career, and complex relationship with Graham. As of 2016, he was working on a novel titled: Atlas Quit, or, A Tale Told by an Idiot.

== “From the Horse's Mouth” ==
As part of the Graham Company's 80th anniversary celebration in 2007, a special performance of From the Horse's Mouth, Magical Tales of Real Dancers, was presented at the Joyce Theater. The production highlighted stories about Martha Graham from veteran Graham dancers including Dorothy Berea, David Chase, Mary Hinkson, Pearl Lang, Peggy Lyman, Judith Janus, Donald McKayle, and others. Hodes' contribution included Martha's Rap, a whimsical recounting of her career that began:

"There once was a dancer named Martha Graham
When she danced she sure did slay ‘em."

== Lifetime achievement award ==
The Martha Hill Foundation presented Hodes with a Lifetime Achievement Award in November 2019. The tribute honors "a professional in the dance field who exemplifies any or all of those qualities for which Martha Hill was most revered—whether an educator or a creative force who has made a significant contribution to the field of dance 'behind the scenes'."

== Personal life and death ==
In 1953, Hodes married dancer and choreographer Linda Margolies. They had two daughters, Catherine Hodes, (born 1956) and Martha Hodes, (born 1958). They divorced in 1964. In 1965, he wed dancer/singer/actress Elizabeth Wullen.

Hodes died in New York City on March 15, 2023, at the age of 98.
