= Arthur Kreutz =

American composer (1906–1991)

Arthur R. Kreutz (July 25, 1906 – March 12, 1991) was an American composer.

== Life and career ==
Kreutz was born in La Crosse, Wisconsin. His paternal grandparents Frank R. Kreutz (originally František Kříž) and Paulina Zahradníková were born in the Czech village Pístina. Arthur's second cousin was the composer Robert E. Kreutz.

Kreutz composed the Paul Bunyan Suite, the Dixie Concerto, the score to Martha Graham's 1942 ballet Land Be Bright, and Symphonic Blues (for orchestra) (1947); some of his orchestral pieces were played by the New York Philharmonic, with whom he appeared at times as a guest conductor. Among his other works is a 1954 opera about the University Greys of the University of Mississippi. Kreutz taught from 1954 until 1961 at the University of Mississippi; he died of cancer in Oxford, Mississippi. The University holds his papers in its libraries.
