= Alfred Gescheidt =

American photographer (1926–2012)

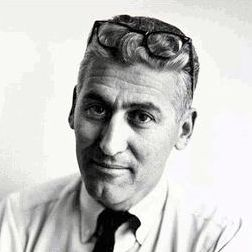
- Born: December 19, 1926
- Died: January 22, 2012 (aged 85); New York City, U.S.

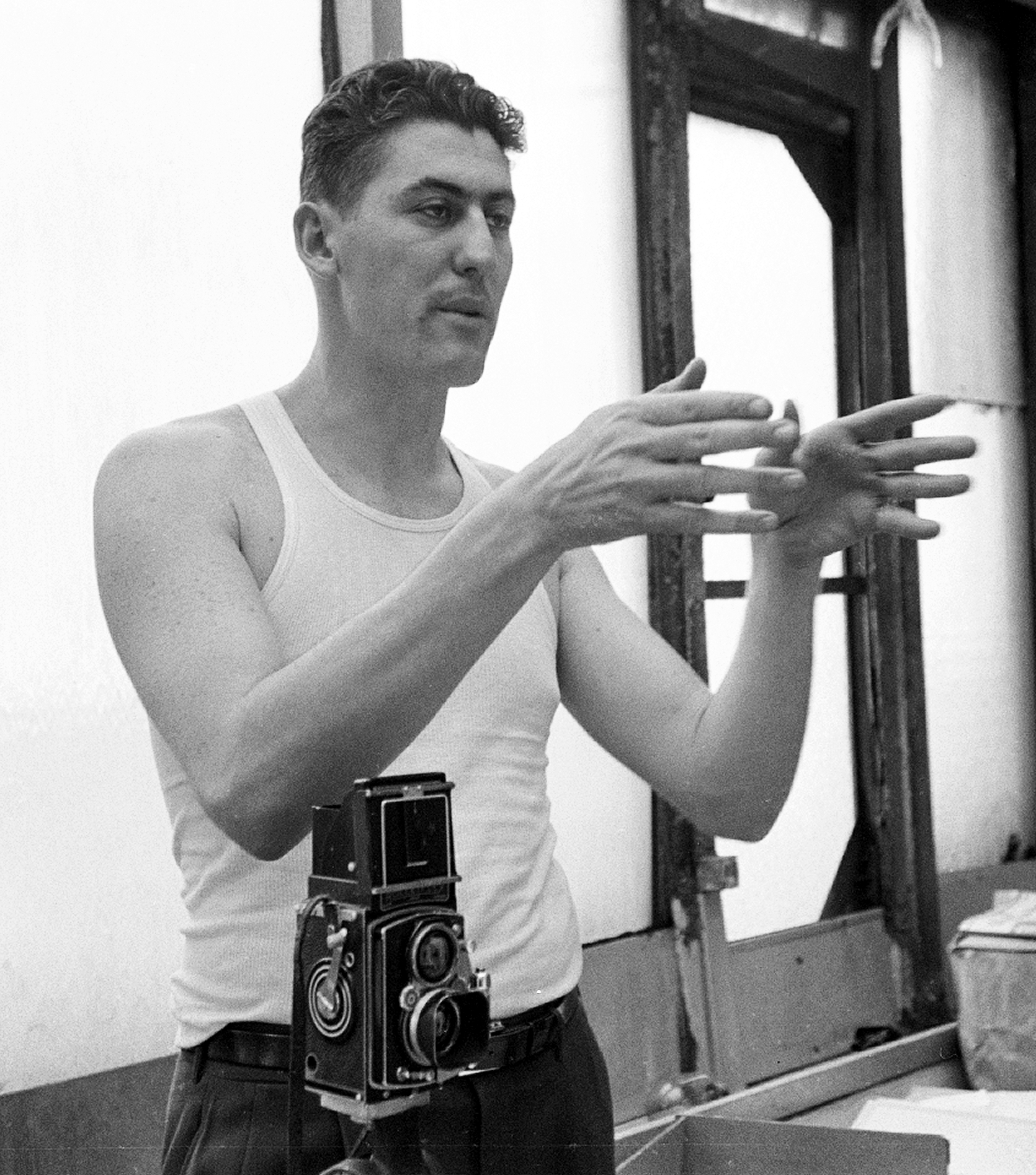
Alfred Gescheidt 1952

Alfred Gescheidt (19 December 1926 - 22 January 2012) was an American photographer. He specialized in photomontage, and worked primarily in commercial and advertising photography.

== Early life and education ==
Alfred Gescheidt was born in Queens, New York on December 19, 1926. His older sister was writer Malvine Cole, and older brother, dancer and choreographer Stuart Hodes. He graduated with honors from The High School of Music & Art in 1944 and went to the Art Students League of New York on a scholarship. He studied there with Will Barnet and Harry Sternberg before being drafted into the U.S. Navy in 1945. After completing his required year of military service, Gescheidt enrolled at the University of New Mexico in Albuquerque, where he studied with Raymond Jonson. In 1949, having decided to become a photographer, he transferred to the Art Center School in Los Angeles, where he studied commercial photography with Will Connell and George Hoyningen-Huene.

== Career ==
Gescheidt returned to New York City in 1950 to work as a freelance photojournalist. In the summer of 1951 Gescheidt had a one-man show at the Village Camera Club. His work first appeared in Life magazine in 1951, when he won fourth prize in the picture story division in the magazine's contest for young photographers. The first three places in the division were won by Dennis Stock, Elliot Erwitt, and Esther Bubley, respectively. From 1955 on he worked primarily in advertising and commercial photography, and he stopped doing photojournalism in the early 1960s.

Alfred married Rae Russel (professional photographer and member of The Photo League) and had two children, Andrew Gescheidt (b. 1958) and Jack Gescheidt (b. 1960).

While much of Gescheidt's work was photographic assignments for advertising agencies, his simultaneously continued his personal focus on documentary "street" photography, especially in his hometown New York City, and also in the darkroom creating a large amount of abstract and humorous photomontage, combining elements of different photographs. His images, which were intentionally unrealistic and often humorous, were created before the invention of digital manipulation via personal computers and Adobe Photoshop. But his darkroom techniques and meticulous printing and retouching made it impossible to determine how his combination images were created. His work appeared on record album and book covers, calendars, posters, greeting cards and postcards, and in many newspapers and magazines, including Colliers, Cue, Esquire, Ladies Home Journal, Life, Look, Mademoiselle, Modern Photography, The National Enquirer, New York, Newsweek, Omni, Pageant, Parade, People, Popular Photography, Saturday Evening Post, The National Star, The New York Times, This Week, and Time, among others. For three years in the 1970s, Oui magazine included a regular photographic segment called Gescheidt's World.

== Notable works ==
In 1964 he collaborated with Frank Jacobs on the book 30 Ways to Stop Smoking, which featured 30 of Gescheidt's manipulated photographs. The photographs, which display what The New Yorker called "Gescheidt's poster-ready Pop surrealism", delivering a "bracingly vulgar, subversive punch", were shown at the New York gallery Higher Pictures in 2013.

Among his most successful posters was "Ronbo", published in 1985, which combined the head of a smiling President Ronald Reagan with the body of the movie character Rambo. The poster was included in the Library of Congress's 2010 exhibition Hope for America: Performers, Politics and Pop Culture, as an example of "politics and camp".

Many of Gescheidt's images were published postcards in the 1980s, working with the American Postcard Co. An early success was a parody of Grant Wood's American Gothic with Ronald and Nancy Reagan as the farmer and his daughter. According to the card's publisher, it had sold 1.5 million copies by 1982. American Gothic was a favourite and continuing theme of Gescheidt, who had inserted the faces of political opponents George Wallace and Shirley Chisholm into the picture in 1970, calling the result Politics Makes Strange Bedfellows.

The cat postcards, calendars, and books that Gescheidt started producing for Pomegranate Artbooks in the 1980s were an exception to his usual practice of photomontage. For his first calendar, City Cat, in 1985, he used previously unpublished black and white photographs he had taken in the early 1950s in New York.

Gescheidt was described by John Durniak, a picture editor for The New York Times, as "the Charlie Chaplin of the camera". Howard Chapnick of the Black Star photo agency characterized him as a practitioner of "surrealistic photography", and as such superior to Man Ray for his "ingenuity, madness, outrageousness and humour".

Alfred Gescheidt died in New York City on 22 January 2012.
