= Hérodiade (disambiguation) =

Hérodiade and Hérodias are French versions of the name of Herodias, wife of Herod II (with whom she had Salome), and later of Herod Antipas. The French version of the name may refer to:

- Hérodias (short story), third of Three Tales by Gustave Flaubert
- Hérodias, one of the characters in Oscar Wilde's original French version of Salome (play)
- Hérodias, one of the characters in Mariotte's opera Salomé (Mariotte)
- Hérodiade, opera in four acts by Jules Massenet, based on Flaubert's "Hérodias"
- Hérodiade, poetry by Stéphane Mallarmé
- Hérodiade (ballet), ballet music by Paul Hindemith based on Mallarmé's poem, premiered in 1944
