= Imagined Wing =

Imagined Wing is a ballet choreographed by Martha Graham to Jeux de Printemps by composer Darius Milhaud. The piece was first presented on October 30, 1944, in the Elizabeth Sprague Coolidge Auditorium at the Library of Congress, Washington, D.C. Costumes were designed by Edythe Gilfond; the set was created by Isamu Noguchi. Elizabeth Sprague Coolidge commissioned the work, along with two other Graham dances, and musical scores for all three dances. Also on the program were Mirror Before Me set to music by Paul Hindemith (later renamed Herodiade) and Appalachian Spring performed to music by Aaron Copland. Imagined Wing's initial showing was also its last. Following tepid reviews, the piece was never performed again.

== Theme, structure and original cast ==
Described in program notes as "a fantasy of theater with several characters in various imagined places." The Prompter sets the stage with a phrase from William Shakespeare. The subsequent spoken passages are also excerpted from his writings. Most details of Imagined Wing's structure have been lost, but one reviewer jotted down a few of the various settings: the woods, the market place, the castle hall, as well as the name of the castle hall scene, The Lady Distracted in Her Dream.

Graham did not appear in the work, which was danced by the Martha Graham Dance Company. The original cast members were:

- The Prompter - Angela Kennedy
- Chorus - Yuriko
- The Performers: Erick Hawkins, Merce Cunningham, May O'Donnell, Nina Fonaroff, Pearl Lang, Marjorie Mazia

== Critical reception ==
The fact Imagined Wing premiered alongside two now-acknowledged Graham masterpieces likely contributed to its poor reception. New York Times critic John Martin thought the piece the weakest of the three works on the program. Despite having "bits of amusing stage directions," as a dance composition, "it lacks body and point." The Dance Observer 's reviewer made similar observations, "Some of the sketches were ingenious," but as a whole the work was "rather slight and improvisational." Theatre Arts Magazine's reporter expressed puzzlement and the conclusion that perhaps the work would reveal its importance during subsequent viewings.

Milhaud's score was also generally disparaged, "pleasant, but trivial," according to one critic; "pretty far removed from Miss Graham's style," wrote another. Only Noguchi's set was spared unfavorable review.

== Backstory ==
Three years after the piece debuted, Graham dancer Marjorie Mazia Guthrie spoke with dance educator/author Ted Dalbotten about Imagined Wing's origins. According to Mazia, Graham disliked Milhaud's score and kept postponing the ballet's creation. One week before the performance, Graham gathered her troupe and doled out the various sections, solos, duets and trios, for the dancers to choreograph on their own. Two or three days before the premiere, Graham reportedly viewed the dancers' efforts and quickly composed transitional entrances and exits. To Dalbotten, Mazia's revelation also explained the work's title, which he viewed as a private joke on Graham's part.

Thus with imagined wing our swift scene flies
In motion of no less celerity
Than that of thought.

— William Shakespeare, Henry V, Prologue, Act III
