= Robert E. Kreutz =

American composer of Catholic liturgical music (1922–1996)

Robert Edward Kreutz
- Born: March 21, 1922; La Crosse, Wisconsin
- Died: April 7, 1996 (aged 74) Denver, Colorado

Robert Edward Kreutz (March 21, 1922 – April 7, 1996) was an American composer of Roman Catholic liturgical worship music.

== Life and career ==
He was born in La Crosse, Wisconsin. His paternal grandfather John Kreutz (originally Jan Kříž) was born in the Czech village Pístina. Robert's second cousin was the composer Arthur R. Kreutz.

Kreutz graduated from Aquinas High School in 1940. Robert Kreutz studied music at the American Conservatory of Music in Chicago, Illinois and at the University of California-Los Angeles. He was best known for the Eucharistic hymn: Gift of Finest Wheat which was first performed at the International Eucharistic Congress in 1976, in Philadelphia, Pennsylvania. Kreutz also wrote many other hymns including "Bread of Love", "Rise, O Lord" and others. He was an accomplished choir director at St. Bernadette Catholic Church in Lakewood, Colorado for more than 30 years.

Kreutz and his wife, Evelyn had nine children. They had three boys: Mark, Scott, and Robert and six girls: Mary, Karen, Gina, Terri, Jackie, and Jill.
