= Linda Hodes =

American dancer (1931–2025)

Linda Hodes Margolies (June 3, 1931 – August 10, 2025) was an American dancer.

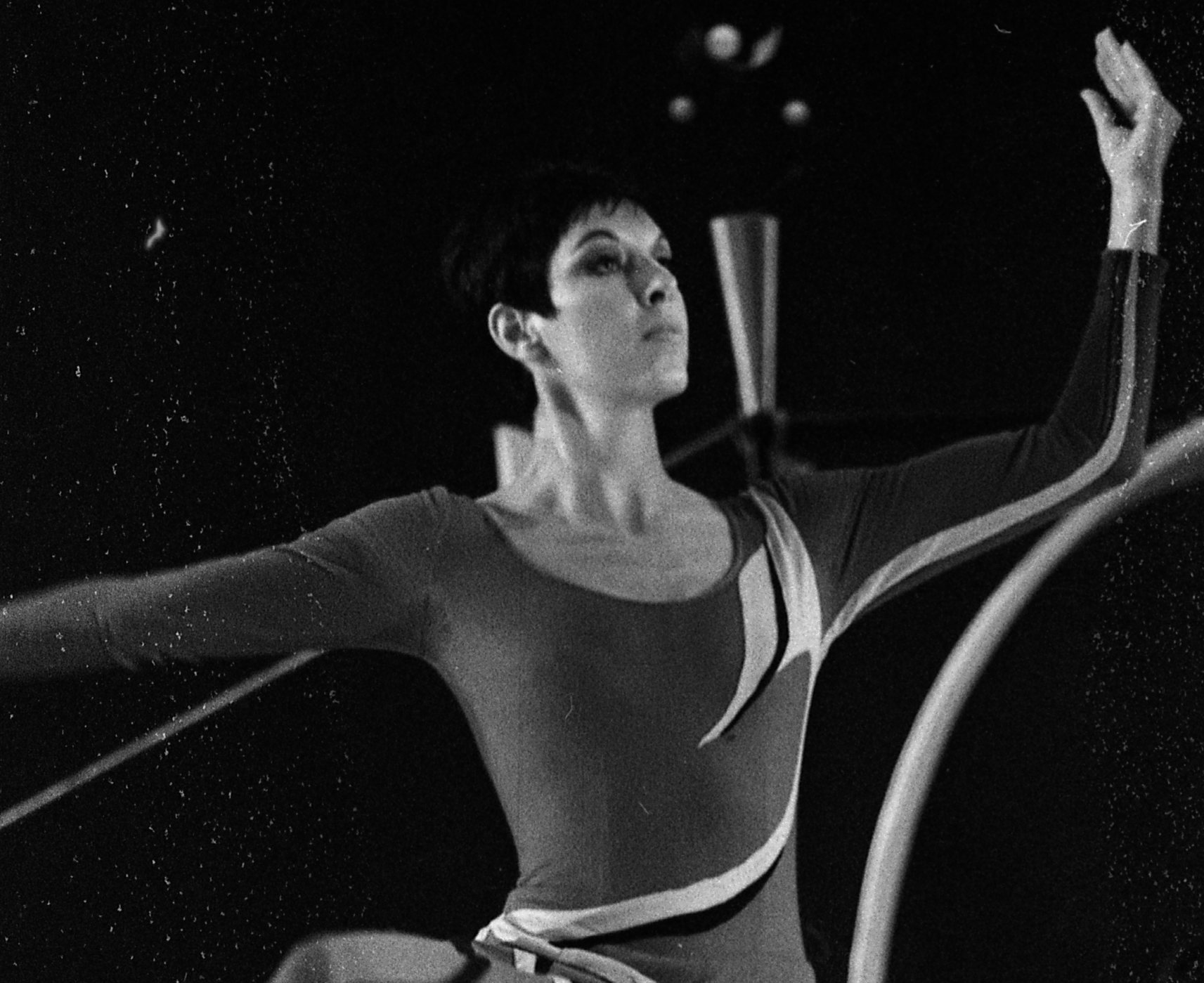
Linda Hodes

== Early life and career ==
Margolies was born in Manhattan, New York, in 1931. She began dancing lessons at the age of nine at the Martha Graham School in New York, the same company she would dance with between 1947–1958.

In 1964 she travelled to Israel as Graham's assistant, in order to help establish a repertory company of modern dance in Israel under the direction of Batsheva de Rothschild and to manage the preparations for the Batsheva Company's debut with Martha Graham's dances.

In 1965, she returned to Israel to instruct the company's dancers in performing Graham's choreographies in works including "The Garden", "War Percentage" and "The Amusement of the Angels", and decided to settle permanently in the country.

Hodes joined the Batsheva Company as a teacher and dancer. She remained with the company until 1970 as a dancer, teacher, and rehearsal director. Until 1975, she was in charge of Martha Graham's repertoire at Batsheva and was associate artistic director intermittently from 1971 to 1974.

In 1970 she retired from dancing at Batsheva and worked as a guest choreographer at the Ramber Ballet in London, and as a teacher and rehearsal director at the Nederlands Dance Theatre (NDT) in the Netherlands. She has also taught dance at the Juilliard School of Dance, Neighborhood Playhouse and the American Dance Festival in New York. She later taught at the Bat-Dor School of Dance, the Jerusalem Academy of Music and Dance, and the Inbal Dance Theater. In 1974, Hodes returned to the Batsheva Company to dance to Graham Dream's work. In 1974 she was the director of the School of Dance and the company of Lia Schubert and Kai Lotman, in Haifa.

In 1975, she returned to New York and became director of the Martha Graham School of Dance, where she served as rehearsal director and from 1979 to 1991 as co-artistic director. She went on to be in charge of Martha Graham's legacy. From 1992 to 1998, she served as rehearsal director of the Paul Taylor Dance Company and artistic director of his company Taylor 2.

== Personal life and death ==
Margolies married American dancer Stuart Hodes, and the couple had two daughters, Catherine and Martha. They divorced in 1964, with Linda then marrying Ehud Ben David in Israel.

Hodes died in Manhattan on August 10, 2025, at the age of 94.
