= Lucia Dlugoszewski =

American classical composer (1925-2000)

- Born: June 16, 1925; Detroit, Michigan
- Died: April 11, 2000 (age 74); New York City, U.S.

Lucia Dlugoszewski (June 16, 1925 – April 11, 2000) was a Polish-American composer, poet, choreographer, (Note: Between 1996 and 2000, she choreographed four works for the Erick Hawkins Dance Company while serving as the company's artistic director following Hawkins' death in 1994. Radical Ardent and Taking Time to be Vulnerable were both premiered in 1999.) performer, and inventor. She developed a unique approach to the grand piano called the "timbre piano," which involved using objects on the strings and playing the piano's interior with percussion mallets, hands, or other methods. She also invented many percussion instruments, including Unsheltered Rattles, Tangent Rattles, Square Drums, and Ladder Harps. She is known for her long association with the Erick Hawkins Dance Company, for which she first composed in 1951. She served as the company's music director until Hawkins's death in 1994, after which she became its artistic director.

== Background and early years ==
The daughter of Polish immigrants, Dlugoszewski was born and raised in Detroit. Beginning at the age of six, she studied piano under Agelageth Morrison at the Detroit Institute of Musical Arts, also known as the Detroit Conservatory of Music. Later in life, she studied pre-med at Wayne State University, where she also took physics courses.

In 1950, Dlugoszewski moved to New York City, where she became based for the rest of her life. In New York, she took piano lessons from Grete Sultan and studied analysis with Felix Salzer, composition with Edgard Varèse, and John Cage.

In New York, Dlugoszewski became involved with the New York School of experimental composers, collaborating with artists and exploring new approaches to composition. Dlugoszewski began working with dancer and choreographer Erick Hawkins in 1951; they married in 1962 but kept their wedding a secret until after Hawkins' death in 1994.

== Compositions ==
Virgil Thomson described hers as "music of great delicacy". Dlugoszewski's compositions have been recorded for Nonesuch Records, Folkways, CRI, and other important contemporary music labels. Her 1975 piece Abyss and Caress, for trumpet and small orchestra, was commissioned by the New York Philharmonic and premièred by Pierre Boulez. In 1977, she became the first woman to win the Koussevitzky International Recording Award with Fire Fragile Flight, for 17 instruments – the work became a signature piece for the Philadelphia ensemble Orchestra of Our Time. The recordings for Nonesuch and CRI released in the 70s were reissued by CRI in 2002 as Disparate Stairway Radical Other along with new work for string quartet and timbre piano.

Beginning in 1957, Dlugoszewski cultivated a professional and personal relationship with the dancer and choreographer Erick Hawkins. Dlugoszewski, a dancer herself, wrote chamber and orchestral scores for the Erick Hawkins Dance Ensemble as well as for the Foundation for Modern Dance. Her music for dance includes Journey of a Poet, written for and executed by Mikhail Baryshnikov, and Taking Time to be Vulnerable, for Pascal Denichou. She also contributed music for chamber ensemble to the soundtrack of the 1962 avant-garde film Guns of the Trees, directed by Jonas Mekas. A very early performance of her timbre piano can be heard in her music for Marie Menken's 1945 film Visual Variations on Noguchi, a score perhaps added later in the early 50s when the composer had arrived in New York.

During a conversation with Cole Gagne in the early 1990s, Dlugoszewski expressed ambivalence at having composed so many collaborative pieces, pointing out that while writing for film and dance allowed her music to be heard by enormous numbers of listeners, those audiences could not give her music their undivided attention.

== Invented Instruments ==
Like those of Henry Cowell, Harry Partch, and Moondog, Dlugoszewski's music was deeply intertwined with the invention and construction of new musical instruments, many of which she utilized in performance. In her interview with Gagne, the composer estimated that she had constructed or designed around a hundred instruments during her career, often collaborating with sculptor Ralph Dorazio, who built instruments to her specifications.

Dlugoszewski was inspired by her teacher Edgard Varèse, who used electronic tools to create disorienting and exciting new sonorities. She explained, "It's not that I was out to invent instruments, but that I wanted to create an ego-less sound possibility, a suchness possibility, so that you would help the ear just to hear the sound for its own sake."

Dlugoszewski's most famous creation is the Timbre Piano, often referred to as an "invented instrument." However, it is more accurately understood as a performance practice and a set of techniques she developed for playing a traditional grand piano. This approach involved using objects on the strings and playing the piano's interior with percussion mallets, hands, or other methods, allowing her to create a diverse range of sounds. The Timbre Piano became a central part of her musical expression throughout her career.

In addition to the Timbre Piano, Dlugoszewski invented a wide variety of unique percussion instruments. These include Unsheltered Rattles, Tangent Rattles, Square Drums, and Ladder Harps, which were often created in "families" of different sizes. The instruments were made from various materials such as wood, glass, skins, and metals, offering a rich and varied sonic palette that she used in her compositions and performances.

== Philosophy ==
Dlugoszewski, like other composers of her generation, claimed a wide and varied assortment of influences, many of them Eastern in origin (Noh drama and haiku, for example).
