= Hérodiade (ballet) =

1944 ballet by Paul Hindemith

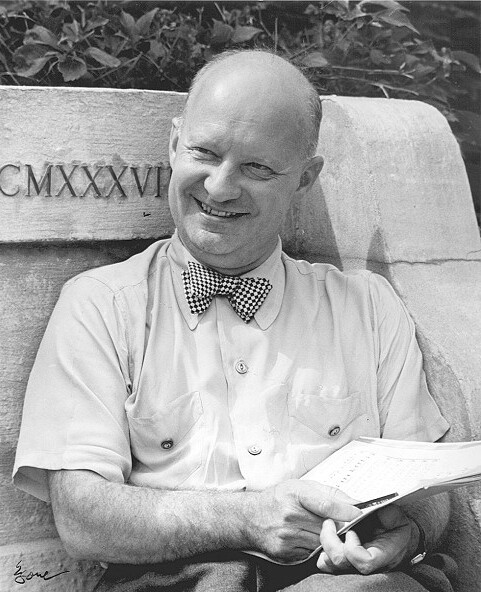
Paul Hindemith in the 1940s

Hérodiade de Stéphane Mallarmé: Recitation orchestrale is a composition by Paul Hindemith written in June 1944 on commission from Martha Graham, supported by funds from the Elizabeth Sprague Coolidge Foundation. The ballet premiered under the title of Herodiade (but had originally been titled Mirror before Me) in the Elizabeth Sprague Coolidge Auditorium at the Library of Congress in Washington DC. The premiere took place on 30 October 1944, sharing the program with Aaron Copland's Appalachian Spring and Darius Milhaud's Jeux du printemps (Graham's ballet title was Imagined Wing), with Martha Graham and May O'Donnell in the leading roles. The choreography was by Martha Graham, stage design was by the Japanese American sculptor Isamu Noguchi, and costumes by Edythe Gilfond.

== Composition ==
The piece uses Stéphane Mallarmé's poem "Hérodiade" as a basis for the dramatic narrative flow of the piece without using the more common fusion of poetry and music, a song. Neither does the subtitle "orchestral recitation" imply an actual recitation of the poetry with the music as in a melodrama. This misunderstanding has led to some misguided performances and recordings. In a letter to Willy Strecker, Hindemith further confirms that "The 'Hérodiade' is not to be spoken! The melodic lines in the orchestra ... are themselves the recitation." Likewise, Hindemith did not set the text as a song because he felt the voice would be a distraction from the dance. He chose to give the melodic lines of the singer to the instruments of the orchestra, often giving the instruments rhythms that mimic the cadences of French poetry and the declamation of the Mallarmé poem. It is this that results in the subtitle "orchestral recitation" and not any intent to actually include a recitation of the poem.

== Instrumentation ==
The instrumentation is similar to Copland's Appalachian Spring, with the addition of oboe and horn and the reduction of strings to one on a part (as opposed to pairs): 1 flute, 1 oboe, 1 clarinet, 1 bassoon, 1 horn, 1 piano, 2 violins, 1 viola, 1 violoncello, 1 string bass.

== Structure ==
The music is in one continuous movement but divided into 11 sections.

1. A short Prèlude in the strings, followed be a wide-spun melody with the full ensemble, ending with a wind instrument repetition of the opening phrase
2. A short string quartet
3. A longer section (Modéré), flute and oboe featured
4. A return to the string quartet Nurse's music
5. A loud outburst, full ensemble, (Vif)
6. Another return to the string quartet Nurse's music
7. An aria for the clarinet
8. Energetic, full ensemble, (Agité)
9. Triumphant waltz, (Vif et passioné)
10. An aria for the bassoon
11. A brief, pathetic Finale

Section 1 – Prèlude

Section 1 – Melody

Section 2 – Nurse: "Tu vis! ou vois-je ici l'ombre d'une princesse?"

Section 3 – Hérodiade: "Reculez. Le blond torrent de mes cheveux immaculés...")

Section 4 – "Sinon la myrrhe gaie..."

Section 5 – Hérodiade: "Laisse la ces parfums"

Section 6 – Nurse: "Pardon! l'âge effaçait"

Section 7 – Hérodiade's scene before the mirror, "O miroir! Eau froide par l'ennui dans ton cadre gelée"

Section 8 – Hérodiade: "Arrête dans ton crime"

Section 9 – Hérodiade: "Oui, c'est pour moi, pour moi, que je fleuris, déserte!"

Section 10 – Hérodiade: "Non, pauvre aieule"

Section 11 – "Vous mentez, ô fleur nue de mes lèvres"
