= Rae Russel =

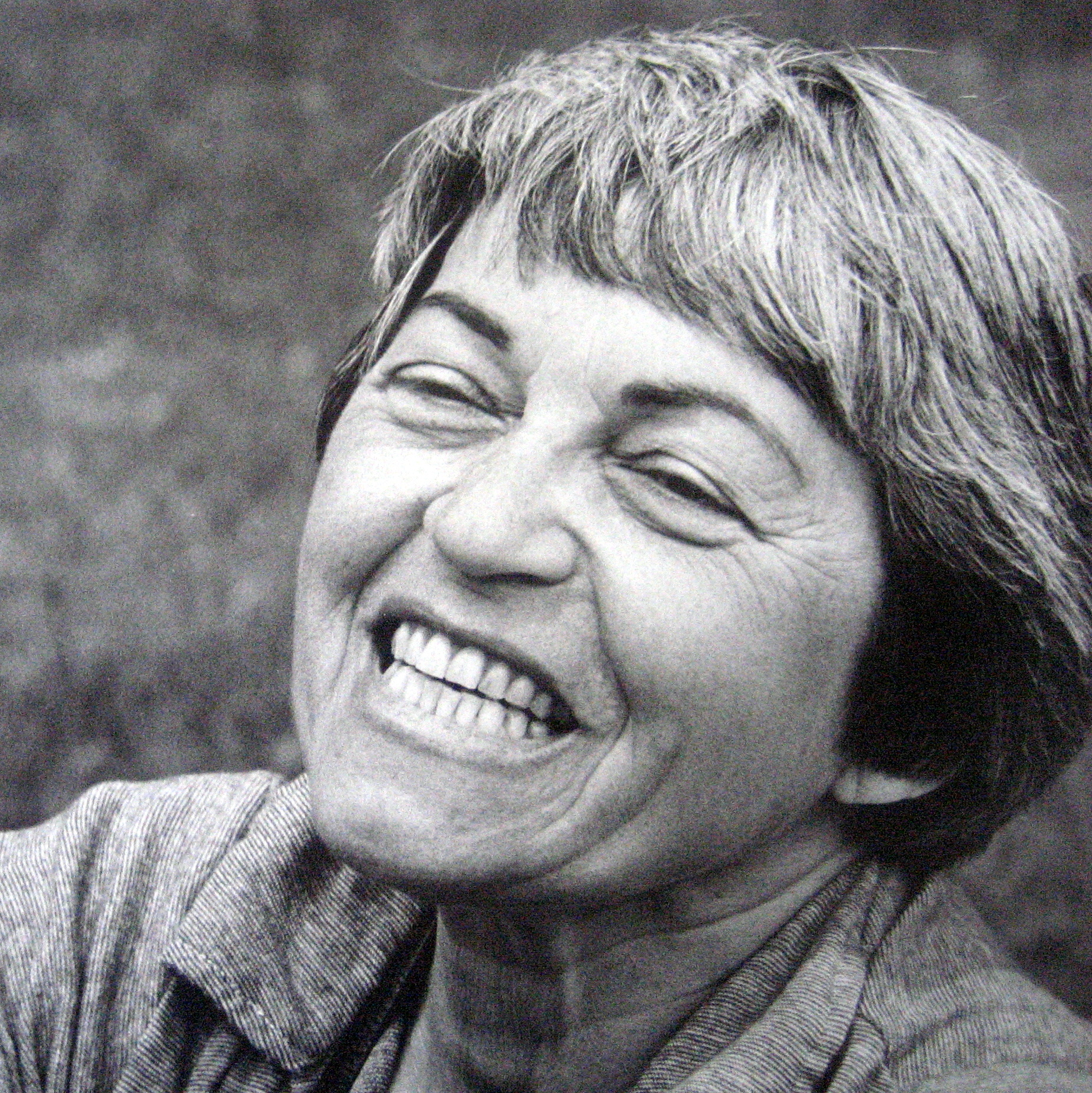
- Born: May 16, 1925; Brooklyn, New York City, New York, United States
- Died: October 17, 2008 (aged 83); Petaluma, California
- Resting place: Moravian Cemetery
- Occupation: Photographer
- Years active: 1944–2008
- Spouse: Alfred Gescheidt (m. 1955)

Rae Russel (16 May 1925 – 17 October 2008) was an American photographer, who specialized in photo-journalism and family portrait work.

== Early life ==
Rae Russel was born Rae Schlussel, May 16, 1925, to Ida and Adolf Schlussel of Brooklyn, New York.

Russel died October 17, 2008, at the age of 83, at Petaluma Valley Hospital in Petaluma, California, after complications from surgery for a brain tumor. She is survived by two sons by her former husband, also a professional photographer, the late Alfred Gescheidt (1926–2011), Andrew Gescheidt, born 1958, and Jack Gescheidt, also a professional photographer, born 1960.

== Exhibitions ==
Her work was exhibited in:

- "This Is the Photo League" (1948–49).
- "The Women of the Photo League" at Higher Pictures Gallery, New York (2009).
- Four exhibitions at the Katonah Museum, New York (1965, 1970, 1975, 1983).
- Photographing Children (1971) and Nursing Home Organization and Operation (1979).
