= Punch and the Judy =

Punch and the Judy is a comic ballet about marital discord choreographed by Martha Graham to music by Robert McBride. Arch Lauterer designed the set, Charlotte Trowbridge, the costumes. Edward Gordon Craig provided text for the narrated portions. The piece premiered on August 10, 1941, at the Bennington College Theatre in Bennington, Vermont.

== Original cast ==
The roles include Punch, The Judy and their child; the winged horse Pegasus; Punch's mistress Pretty Polly; The Three Heroes: the Soldier, the Scout and the Highwayman; and three Fates. The original cast members were:

- Martha Graham as The Judy
- Erick Hawkins as Punch
- Merce Cunningham as Pegasus
- Nina Fonaroff as the Child
- Pearl Lang as Pretty Polly
- Mark Ryder (then known as Sasha Liebich) as the Soldier
- David Zellmer as the Scout
- David Campbell as the Highwayman
- Jean Erdman, Jane Dudley and Ethel Butler as the Fates

== Title, theme and structure ==
The ballet's title is derived from the traditional, usually violent, Punch and Judy puppet theater. According to the original program notes, "'Punch and the Judy' concerns man and woman. The text is squabble and scuffle. The Three Fates are any three women who direct the lives of others. The Three Heroes are the Idealists. Pegasus is that force which enables us to imagine or escape."

The ballet unfolds in seven sections:

- Overture
- Prologue-The Fates set the stage
- First Dilemma-The Judy soliloquizes-Punch shows off-The Child enters-Trouble starts
- Interlude-Pegasus enters-The Flight to Dream
- Second Dilemma-The family gathers-Pretty Polly enters-Punch seduces-The Judy rages-The Heroes exalt-The Judy despairs
- Interlude-Pegasus enters-The Flight to Dream
- Third Dilemma-The Justice is blindfolded-Punch triumphs-The Heroes march-The Fates intervene-Punch falls-The Judy intervenes-Punch brags again-The Judy chooses-The Fates direct, da capo

The action revolves around the Judy, the discontented wife of boastful, unfaithful Punch. To escape her unhappiness, she turns to Pegasus, who carries her to a blissful dreamworld. In search of a new mate, she flirts with each of the Three Heroes, but is ultimately unsatisfied with them. In the ballet's finale, a game of blind man's bluff, she grasps a promising manly figure. But, when her blindfold is removed, she discovers Punch in her arms. The last spoken words, "Shall we begin again?," highlights the utter futility of their redundant domestic life.

== Critical reception ==
New York Times critic John Martin described the performance as "exemplary", writing "Miss Graham is as adept a comedian and as great a master of timing as you are likely to find anywhere around, and the movement she has created for herself is convulsingly eloquent." Another critic described her comedic sense as "almost Chaplinesque"
