= Vera Fonaroff =

Russian musician (1883–1962)

Vera Fonaroff (June 14, 1883, Kiev – July 23, 1962, New York, NY) was an American classical violinist and violin teacher of Russian-Jewish heritage.

== Personal life ==
Born in Kiev on June 14, 1883, to Alexander and Sonia Hochstein, the family immigrated to the United States in 1900. In 1905 she married Mark Fonaroff, a fellow Russian emigrant who was also her violin teacher and is also known for famous chess game he played against José Raúl Capablanca in 1918. They had two daughters. Olga Fonaroff (1910–1933) was mentally handicapped. Nina Fonaroff (1914–2003) became a dancer with the Martha Graham Dance Company.

== Performance career ==
At nine years old, Fonaroff debuted as a violin soloist with the Metropolitan Opera House Orchestra, and thereafter made frequent solo appearances. After a period in England, studying and touring as a soloist and recitalist with the pianist Richard Epstein, she returned to New York to study with Franz Kneisel. In 1909, Fonaroff joined the all-woman Olive Mead String Quartet as second violinist.

== Teaching ==
In 1923, Fonaroff began teaching at the Juilliard School. From 1926 to 1939 and 1948 to 1955, she taught violin, and she was director of violin instruction from 1924 to 1930. From 1941 to 1962, she was also on the faculty at the Mannes College of Music. Fonaroff also taught at the Damrosch Institute, the Henry Street Settlement Music School, and the Curtis Institute of Music in Philadelphia. Her students included Sanford Allen, the first black member of the New York Philharmonic.
