= Guns of the Trees =

- Directed by: Jonas Mekas
- Starring: Adolfas Mekas; Frances Stillman; Ben Carruthers; Argus Spear Juillard
- Music by: Lucia Dlugoszewski
- Distributed by: The Film-Makers' Cooperative
- Release date: 1962
- Running time: 86 minutes
- Country: United States
- Language: English

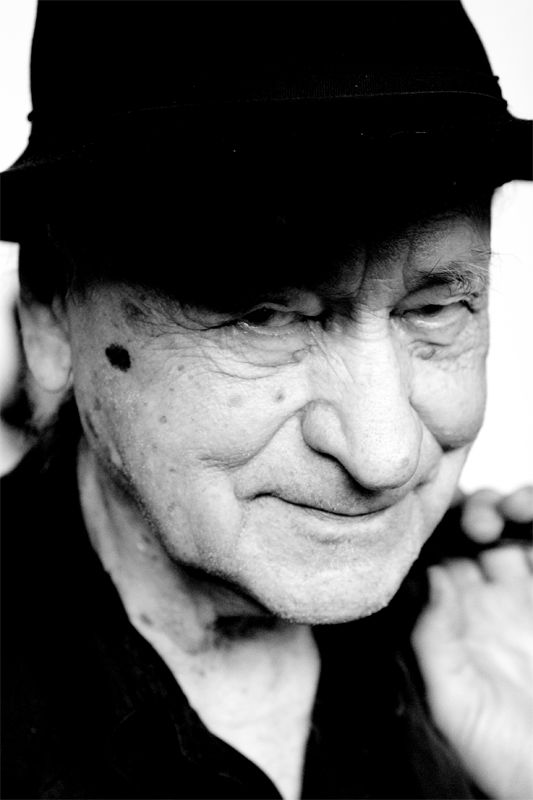
A portrait of Jonas Mekas

Guns of the Trees is a 1962 American black-and-white film by Jonas Mekas. It follows two young couples – Barbara and Gregory (Frances Stillman and Adolfas Mekas) and Argus and Ben (Argus Spear Juillard and Ben Carruthers). The film features an original musical score by Lucia Dlugoszewski and also folk songs by Sara Wiley, Caither Wiley and Tom Sankey. It also features Allen Ginsberg reading his poetry. George Maciunas makes a short appearance in the film.
