= Olive Mead =

American violinist (1874–1946)

- Also known as: Olive Mead Green
- Born: 1875; Cambridge, Massachusetts, United States
- Died: 1946 (aged 71) Cambridge, Massachusetts, United States
- Genres: Classical music
- Occupation: Musician
- Instrument: Violin
- Spouse: Merrill Holden Green

Olive Mead (1874–1946) was an American classical violinist. She was a successful soloist and chamber player, performing with Amy Beach, among many others. She formed her own well-regarded string-quartet, the Olive Mead Quartet (1903–1917), which featured only women. Its members were Vera Fonaroff, Gladys North, and Lillian Littlehales. She was a student of Julius Eichberg and Franz Kneisel.

== Personal history ==
She was born in Cambridge, Massachusetts and began studying the violin at the age of 7. She began studies with Eichberg and Kneisel in 1888 and made her debut at Steinert Hall in Boston at the age of 20. She married New York realty professional Merrill Holden Green, who died in 1918. She died at her home in Cambridge in 1946 at the age of 71, survived by two of her three sons.

== Professional history ==
At the age of 25, she made a European tour with Franz Kneisel and his wife, during which she had the opportunity to meet Johannes Brahms. In 1898 she became a soloist for the Boston Symphony Orchestra, and in later years for the Chicago Symphony Orchestra. She also played at diplomatic receptions in London as well as gatherings hosted by Sir Lawrence Alma-Tadema. Her performance at the Salle Erard in London in June 1900 was noted as being "immensely intelligent". In 1910, the Olive Mead Quartet played a benefit for the Graduate Nurses Association at the Columbia Theater in Washington, D.C.
