= Will Connell =

American photographer

William Connell (1898 – 1961) was a self-taught American portrait and industrial photographer.

Connell was born in McPherson, Kansas. His father was a cowpuncher, who abandoned the family. Connell's mother, a school teacher, moved to California, where Connell attended Los Angeles High School. He dropped out in 10th grade to join the Army, but World War I came to an end and he could not enlist.

Connell taught himself photography and later opened a studio in downtown Los Angeles. By the late 1920s, he began to work in commercial photography for publications, such as Life, Sunset, Time, U.S. Camera and Vogue.

By the early 1930s, Connell was working primarily as a glamor and publicity photographer for various motion picture studios, including Metro-Goldwyn-Mayer and Republic Studios. During this time he also frequently photographed Los Angeles area landscape. Connell was a close friend of Lloyd Wright the LA Architect and son of Frank Lloyd Wright and documented much of Lloyd Wright's work in the 1930s and 1940s.

Later, Connell accepted commissions from the business community. Photographs of commercial, industrial and retail sectors make up the majority of his later work. He photographed pre- and post- World War II industrial production, including developing industries such as aerospace, oil, power generation and transmission, construction and steel.

Connell taught photography at Art Center College of Design then in Los Angeles, from 1931 until his death there in 1961. He wrote a long-running column in U.S. Camera called "Counsel by Connell".

== Legacy ==
The UCR/California Museum of Photography Will Connell archive at the University of California, Riverside archive contains approximately 15,000 of Connell's negatives and prints along with individual periodicals, personal notes, technical photographic books, manuscripts, and photographic equipment. The dates of the images range from 1926 through about 1960, although the majority of negatives originated during the 1930s and 1940s.

== Books by Will Connell ==
- In Pictures: A Hollywood Satire (1937)
- The Missions of California (1941)
- About Photography (1949)
