= Peter Sparling =

American dancer and academic

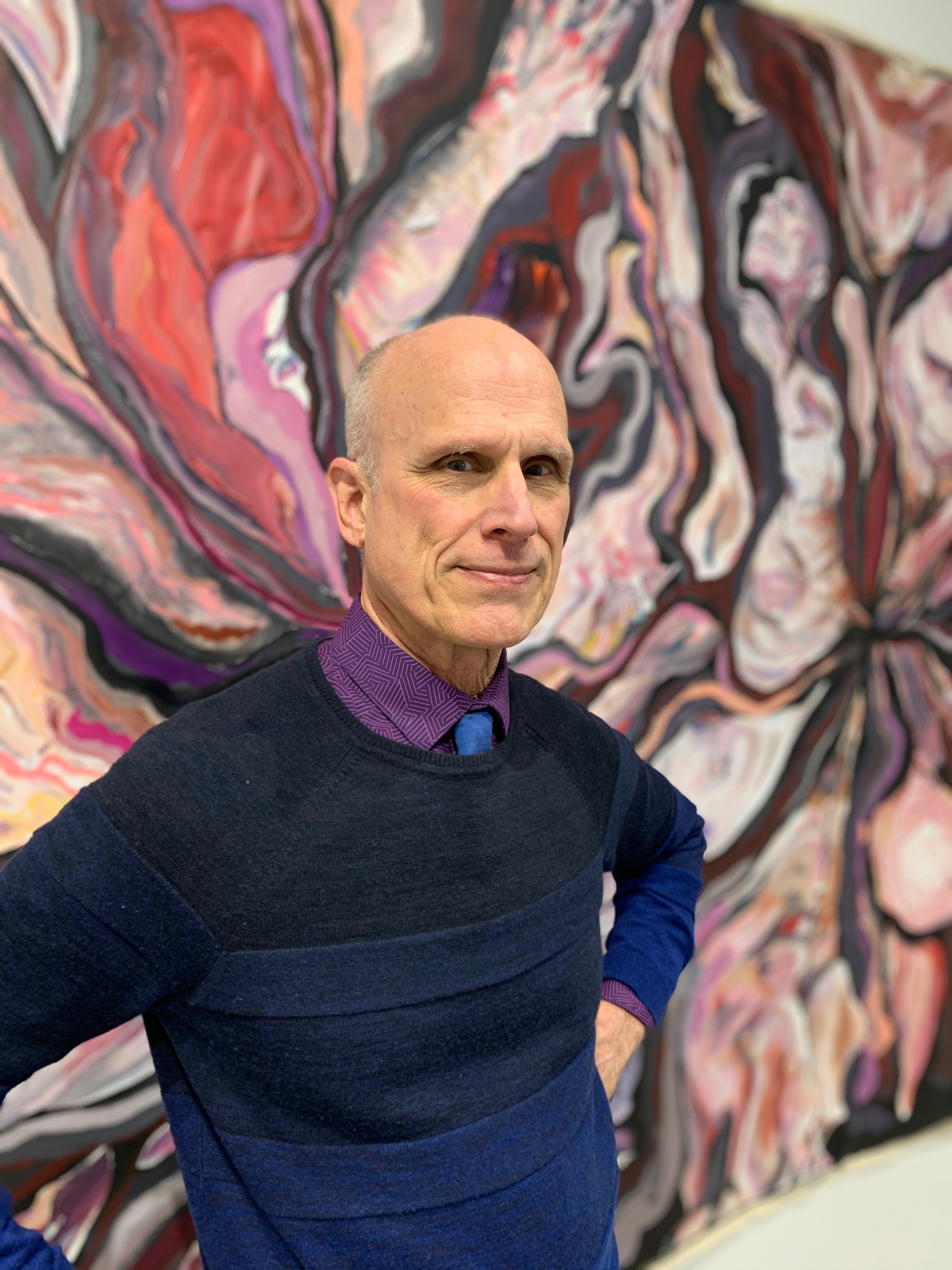
Peter Sparling in 2020

Peter Sparling is an American dancer/choreographer, writer, video artist and painter. He is the Rudolf Arnheim Distinguished University Professor Emeritus of Dance and an Arthur F. Thurnau Professor of Dance at University of Michigan. A former chair of the Department of Dance, he retired from U-M in June, 2018. He was also Artistic Director of the Peter Sparling Dance Company in New York (1979-84) and in Ann Arbor (1993-2007).

== Dancer ==
Sparling is a native of Detroit and graduated from Interlochen Arts Academy and The Juilliard School, He danced with the José Limón Dance Company from 1971-73. From 1973-87, he was a principal dancer with the Martha Graham Dance Company.

== Choreographer, teacher, and director ==
Sparling also served as Martha Graham's choreographic assistant during his period with Martha Graham Dance Company. Since then, he returned often to perform, coach, and teach. As a regisseur of the Martha Graham Trust, he has staged Graham's works with his own company and other companies all over the world.

Sparling presented Peter Sparling Dance Company and his solo performance, "Solo Flight", for five successive seasons at New York's Riverside Dance Festival from 1979-83. He held residencies at the American Dance Festival, at numerous American universities and in Mexico, Paris, London, Australia, Portugal, and Taiwan.

== Grants and positions ==
Sparling was on the roster of the Fulbright Senior Specialists Program and a National Screening Committee Member for the Institute of International Education/US Graduate Student Fulbright Program. He was a faculty fellow with the first Rackham Summer Interdisciplinary Institute and a member of the UM Society of Fellows and he operated as a Interdisciplinary Faculty Associate at the Center for Research on Learning and Teaching from 2001-2002. He has written texts on performance and had his poetry and articles published in Ballet Review, the Michigan Quarterly Review and Choreography and Dance. He choreographed and directed Gluck's opera, Orfeo ed Euridice, for the University Musical Society's 2001-2002 season.

== Works ==
Sparling was commissioned by the Detroit Institute of Arts to create work for both the "Detroit 300: Artists Take on Detroit: Projects for the Tricentennial" and the exhibit "Degas and the Dance."

His solo show, "Bodytalk: A Vaudeville for Dancing Man at Middle Age," premiered at the 2002 Ann Arbor Summer Festival, featuring original text and video as well as a host of collaborators such as Linda Gregerson, Rudolf Arnheim, and Charles Baxter. In 2004, also at the Ann Arbor Summer Festival, his video/performance work "Peninsula" premiered and has toured throughout the state as well as to the Chicago Humanities Festival. The work celebrates the cultural and economic history, geography, and diverse landscapes of his home state of Michigan. His video dance, "Babel," was selected for screening at the 2007 NY Dance on Camera Festival at Lincoln Center. It also featured in his new video dance installation, "Allegorical," in November of 2007.

In April 2008, his composition titled "Vox Humana" opened at the Grand Rapids Ballet. Following that, he embarked on his next endeavor, "Climbing Sainte-Victoire" — a comprehensive dance and theater production influenced by Cézanne's later paintings. In the dance video, Sparling narrates and reads poetry with music provided by Erik Satie, Xenharmonic Gamelan and Ann Arborite Frank Pahl.

Sparling taught "screendance" at U-M for 20 years and has produced over 100 videos, many having been selected for screening at film festivals globally, including Ann Arbor Film Festival, Lisbon's InShadow Festival and Cannes Court Métrage. As a painter, he has shown works in numerous group shows and five solo exhibitions.

== Awards ==
Sparling is a recipient of the 1998 Governor's Michigan Artist Award and grants from the National Endowment for the Arts, Michigan Council for Arts and Cultural Affairs and Arts Foundation of Michigan. Since coming to the University of Michigan in 1984, he has received a Faculty Recognition Award and grants from OVPR, Rackham School for Graduate Studies, and the Office of the President. Sparling was a 2003 Michigan Road Scholar and was honored as a distinguished alumnus of Interlochen Center for the Arts for its 75th anniversary.

Sparling received the Adaptive Re-Use Award from the Ann Arbor Historical Commission for a project that renovated a ball bearing factory along Ann Arbor's North Main St. corridor for the organization's new home.
