= Nina Fonaroff =

American dancer, choreographer and teacher (1914–2003)

- Born: 3 March 1914; New York City, United States
- Died: 14 August 2003 (aged 89); London, United Kingdom
- Occupations: Dancer, choreographer, teacher
- Years active: 1930s–1990s

Nina Fonaroff (3 March 1914 – 14 August 2003) was an American dancer, choreographer and teacher. She was an early member of the Martha Graham Dance Company

== Early life ==
Fonaroff was born in New York City to Russian émigré parents in a musically active household. Her father, Mark Fonaroff, was among the first Russian violinists to teach at the Institute of Musical Art in New York, and family friends included Sergei Rachmaninoff and Pablo Casals. Her mother Vera was also classical violinist and violin teacher. Nina studied violin and piano as a child and painted as well, later attending the Max Reinhardt School of Theatre and Design in Vienna and studying with George Grosz in New York.

She began formal dance training at the age of 11 with Michel Fokine and his wife Vera Fokina, studying the style of Isadora Duncan. She later attended the School of American Ballet and the Cornish School in Seattle, where she met Martha Graham and the composer Louis Horst, who became a major influence.

== Career ==
Fonaroff joined the Martha Graham Dance Company in 1936, becoming a soloist the following year. She danced in key works including American Document (1938) and Every Soul Is a Circus (1939) alongside Merce Cunningham and Erick Hawkins. Fonaroff also starred in Letter to the World, Punch and the Judy, Deaths and Entrances and Appalachian Spring (1944). She served as assistant to Horst for more than a decade.

After leaving the Graham company in 1946, Fonaroff choreographed and led her own ensemble, Nina Fonaroff and Company. Her first full program of choreography received critical acclaim for her talent for design and movement. She was also among six choreographers featured in programs at the 92nd Street Y.

Fonaroff was a respected teacher at institutions including Sarah Lawrence College, Bennington College, Teachers College at Columbia University, and the Neighborhood Playhouse School of the Theatre. In 1972 she moved to London to teach choreography at the London School of Contemporary Dance, where she later founded a choreography department. Fonaroff continued living there. She also taught in Leeds, Oslo, Stockholm and Copenhagen during the 1980s and 1990s.

== Later life and death ==
Fonaroff retired from the London School of Contemporary Dance in 1990 but continued to teach internationally. At the time of her death, she was in the finishing stages of writing a book on choreography. Nina Fonaroff died on 14 August 2003 in London at the age of 89. She had no immediate survivors.
