= Pístina =

- Municipality
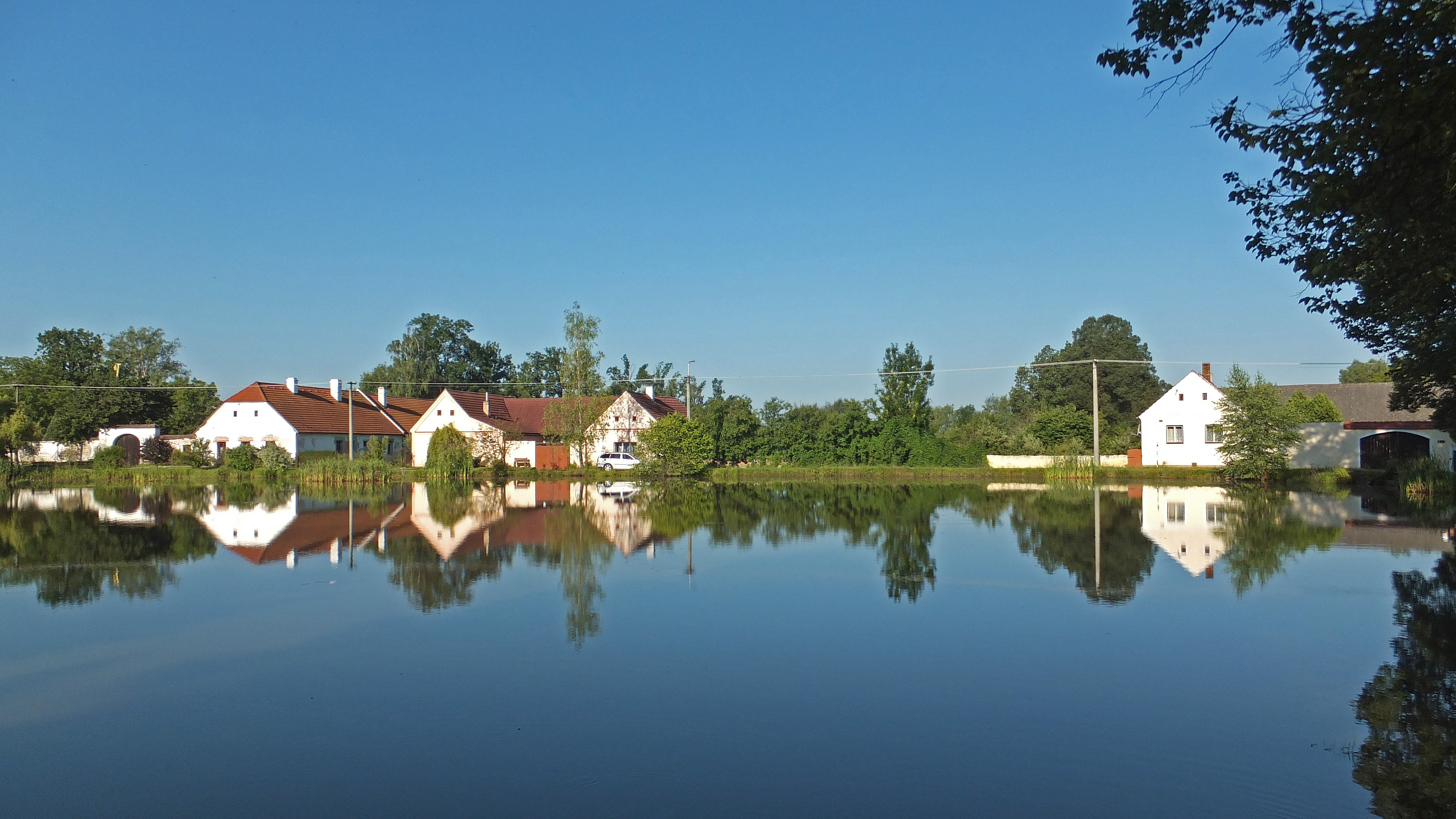
- Pond in the centre of Pístina

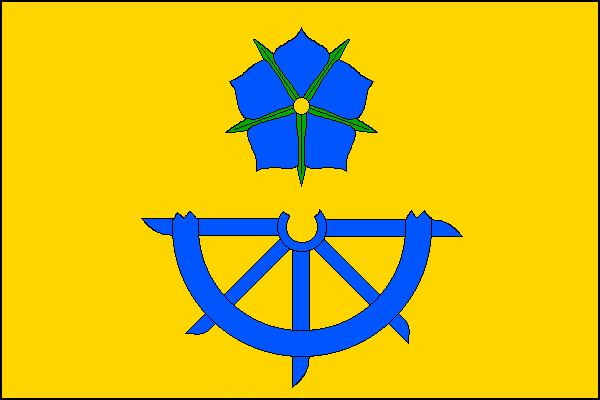
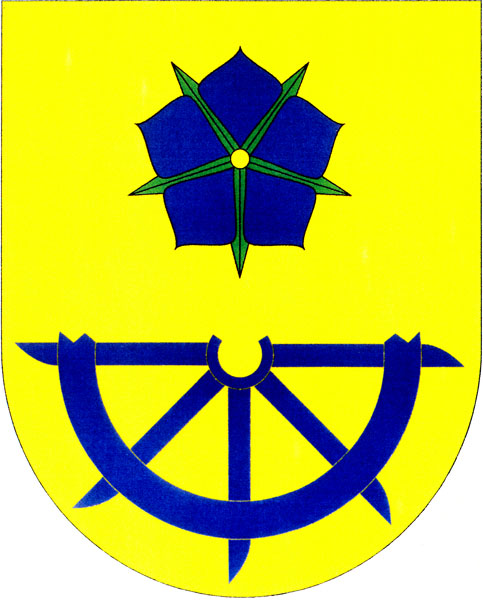
- Flag Coat of arms

- Location in the Czech Republic
- Coordinates: 49°2′59″N 14°54′5″E
- Country: Czech Republic
- Region: South Bohemian
- District: Jindřichův Hradec
- First mentioned: 1397

Area
  - Total: 10.15 km^{2} (3.92 sq mi)
- Elevation: 458 m (1,503 ft)

Population (2026-01-01)
  - Total: 109
  - Density: 10.7/km^{2} (27.8/sq mi)
- Time zone: UTC+1 (CET)
  - Summer (DST): UTC+2 (CEST)
- Postal code: 378 02
- Website: www.pistina.cz

Pístina is a municipality and village in Jindřichův Hradec District in the South Bohemian Region of the Czech Republic. It has about 100 inhabitants. The historic centre of the village is well preserved and is protected as a village monument zone.

Pístina lies approximately 14 kilometres (9 mi) south-west of Jindřichův Hradec, 31 km (19 mi) east of České Budějovice, and 120 km (75 mi) south of Prague.

== Demographics ==
Historical population
| Year | Pop. | ±% |
|---|---|---|
| 1869 | 334 | — |
| 1880 | 374 | +12.0% |
| 1890 | 329 | −12.0% |
| 1900 | 351 | +6.7% |
| 1910 | 339 | −3.4% |
| 1921 | 326 | −3.8% |
| 1930 | 281 | −13.8% |
| 1950 | 196 | −30.2% |
| 1961 | 191 | −2.6% |
| 1970 | 181 | −5.2% |
| 1980 | 134 | −26.0% |
| 1991 | 91 | −32.1% |
| 2001 | 168 | +84.6% |
| 2011 | 189 | +12.5% |
| 2021 | 103 | −45.5% |
Source: Censuses
