= Pearl Lang =

American dancer, choreographer and teacher (1921–2009)

Lang, circa 1974

Pearl Lang (May 29, 1921 – February 24, 2009) was an American dancer, choreographer and teacher renowned as an interpreter and propagator of the choreography style of Martha Graham, and also for her own longtime dance company, the Pearl Lang Dance Theater. She is known for Appalachian Spring (1944), American Masters (1985) and Driven (2001).

== Career ==
A native of Chicago, Lang began her dance training as a child and studied acting at the Goodman Theatre. Her dance teacher was Frances Allis who taught movement for actors as well as her own modern dance technique which has many similarities to Graham's. Lang studied Allis technique and performed with her company in Chicago. In 1938, at the age of 17, she enrolled in a program for gifted students at the University of Chicago, where she remained until 1941, the year of her move to New York. Born Pearl Lack, she adopted the stage name, "Pearl Lang", she studied with Martha Graham and Louis Horst and joined the Martha Graham Dance Company where she remained as a soloist from 1942 to 1952, and as a guest artist from 1954 through the late 1970s. She was the first woman to dance Martha Graham's roles in seven dances of Graham repertoire which she performed intermittently for thirty years to critical and audience acclaim. She was an original cast member in Deaths and Entrances, Punch and the Judy, Land Be Bright, Imagined Wing, Diversion of Angels, Canticle for Innocent Comedians, Ardent Song, Dark Meadow, Night Journey, Eye of Anguish, and Appalachian Spring. She was also a featured dancer in Broadway productions of Carousel (1945–47), Finian's Rainbow, and Peer Gynt.

In 1952, she founded her own company, Pearl Lang Dance Theater, for which she choreographed sixty-three works, thirty-six of which were based on Jewish themes. She choreographed for film, opera, and television and her works have been performed by the Dutch National Ballet, Boston Ballet, and the Batsheva Dance Company of Israel. In 1970, she invited Alvin Ailey and his company to share a three-story building with her dance company at 229 East 59th Street in Manhattan where, together, they co-directed the American Dance Center as a joint school. Pearl Lang Dance Theater's last New York season was held at the Danny Kaye Playhouse in 2001.

Among the many citations and awards that Lang received are two Guggenheim Fellowships for Choreography; the Martha Graham Award for Performance and Choreography; The Workmen's Circle Award for her contribution to Jewish Culture through Dance; the Achievement Award from the Artists and Writers for Peace in the Middle East; the Achievement Award from the Congress for Jewish Culture; the Cultural Achievement Award from the National Foundation for Jewish Culture; Queens College Award for Excellence in Jewish Art, and from the Juilliard School, an Honorary Doctor of Fine Arts on May 19, 1995. In 1997, she was inducted into the Hall of Fame by the International Committee for The Dance Library of Israel. In 2001 at the American Dance Festival she received the award for "Lifetime Distinguished Teaching".

As a teacher, Lang reached generations of young dancers. She served on the faculties of Yale University from 1954 to 1968, Juilliard School of Music from 1952 to 1969, Connecticut College and Neighborhood Playhouse from 1963 to 1968, and the Martha Graham School of Contemporary Dance up until shortly before her death. Among her many students were singer Madonna and choreographer Pina Bausch.

Lang was recuperating from hip surgery when she died of a heart attack in Manhattan, at age 87. She lived on the Upper West Side with her husband, actor Joseph Wiseman, to whom she had been married since 1964. Wiseman himself died less than eight months later, on October 19.

== Films ==
- Lang and Francisco Moncion dance performance: Black Marigolds, music by Alan Hovhaness. From a 1962 broadcast of CBS Sunday morning program Camera Three, directed by Nick Havinga and presented in cooperation with the New York State Education Department.
- The Dybbuk for CBC

== Choreographic works ==
- Song of Deborah, Moonsung and Windsung 1952
- Legend, Rites 1953
- And Joy is My Witness, Nightflight 1954
- Sky Chant 1957
- Persephone 1958
- Black Marigolds 1959
- Shirah 1960
- Apansionada 1961
- Broken Dialogues 1962
- Shore Bourne 1964
- Dismembered Fable 1965
- Pray for Dark Birds 1966
- Tongues of Fire 1967
- Piece for Brass 1969
- Moonways and Dark Tides 1970
- Sharjuhm 1971
- At That Point in Place and Time 1973
- The Possessed 1974
- Prairie Steps 1975
- Bach Rondelays, I Never Saw Another Butterfly, A Seder Night, Kaddish 1977
- Icarus, Cantigas Ladino 1978
- Notturno 1980
- Gypsy Ballad, Hanele the Orphan, The Tailor's Megilleh 1981
- Psalm, Song of Songs 1983
- Tehillim 1984
- Dance Panel #7 2000
- The Time is Out of Joint 2001
