= Blakeley White-McGuire =

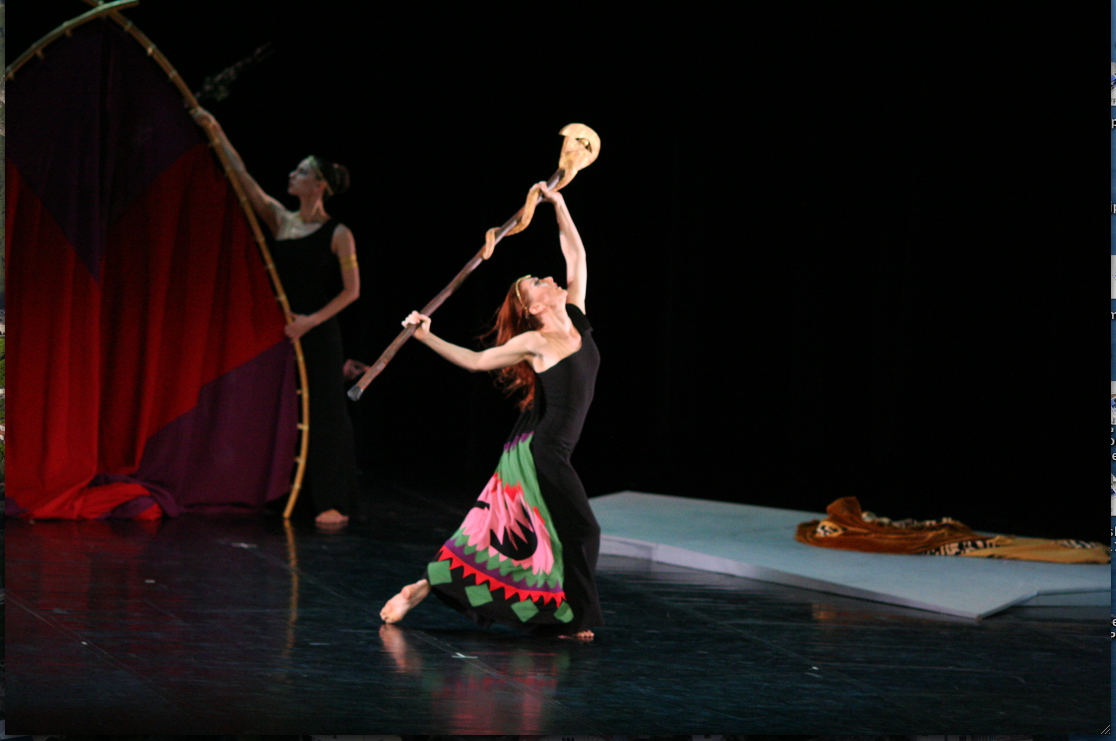
Principal Dancer, Blakeley White-McGuire as Cassandra in Clytemnestra with Martha Graham Dance Company. © Costas Cacaroukas.

Blakeley White-McGuire born in Baton Rouge, Louisiana, is a dancer, choreographer, répétiteur, and educator. She is a Principal Guest Artist and former Principal Dancer of Martha Graham Dance Company. Described by Gia Kourlas of the New York Times as having a "powerful technique and dramatic instinct with an appealing modern spunk", White-McGuire has received widespread critical acclaim as a Graham dancer.

== Early life and career ==
Raised in southern Louisiana, in her youth White-McGuire participated in community dance programs studying ballet, jazz, and tap, and giving performances at seasonal outdoor festivals and Mardi Gras balls. After receiving a brochure from her mother about summer training programs, she came to New York City in 1993 and decided to stay. Upon completing the Professional Trainee Program at the Martha Graham Center of Contemporary Dance in 1996 - where she studied with Pearl Lang and Linda Hodes - she began her dance career by performing with Richard Move. She spent the next six years performing with choreographers including Jacqulyn Buglisi, Martha Clarke, Seán Curran, Pascal Rioult, and the Ballet at Metropolitan Opera.

Joining the Martha Graham Dance Company in 2002, White-McGuire swiftly attained principal dancer status. During her time with the company she performed all of the major Graham roles - including the Empress in Every Soul is a Circus, The Bride in Appalachian Spring, The Woman in Red in Diversion of Angels, Ariadne in Errand Into The Maze, the title role in Phaedra, The Chosen One in Graham's The Rite of Spring, The Soloist in Satyric Festival Song, Deep Song, Sketches from Chronicle, The Frontier Woman in Frontier, Medea in Cave of The Heart, and Jocasta in Night Journey - in the repertoire, had original work set on her by Larry Keigwin, Luca Veggetti, Nacho Duato, Richard Move, Robert Wilson, Bulayarang Pagarlava, and Anne Bogart/SITI Company, and led the company on numerous tours across the country and abroad. Some of her honours from this time include winning the Premio Positano Leonide Massine prize for Contemporary Dance Performance from the Italian government, inspiring and dancing as the model for doodler Mike Dutton's and animator Ryan Woodward's Google Doodle honouring Martha Graham's 117th birthday, recreating Graham's lost solo Imperial Gesture and leading role in Notes for a Voyage, receiving the Italian International Career Achievement Award from Antonio Fini, and being selected as one of the best performers of 2011, 2012, and 2013 by Wendy Perron for Dance Magazine.

After fifteen years of performing, White-McGuire left the Graham Company in 2017 to pursue other projects. Since then, she has staged Diversion of Angels on Paul Taylor Dance Company and Sketches from Chronicle on Royal Ballet of Flanders, performed in Jacqulyn Buglisi's revival of Bare To the Wall, performed in Marta Renzi's feature film Her Magnum Opus, presented her research on Imperial Gesture with former Graham dancer Kim Jones at The Arts In Society Conference, and joined the faculty of Laguardia High School of Performing Arts as the master teacher of Graham Technique.

As a choreographer, White-McGuire has had her work presented by Jacob's Pillow, The Museum of Arts and Design, The Graham Company, Downtown Dance Festival, Dancers Responding to Aids, Cape Dance Festival, New Ballet Ensemble, University of Louisiana, Baton Rouge Ballet Theater, The Watermill Center, Roxbury Arts Group, RAW, and The Moving Beauty Series at Williamsburg Movement and Arts Center. McGuire holds her MFA in Interdisciplinary Arts from Goddard College and has served on the faculties of The Ailey School, The New School, The Actors Studio, New Ballet Ensemble & School, and since 2001 has been a faculty member of The Graham School.

== Personal life ==
White-McGuire lives in Manhattan. She is a member of Dance Films Association.
