= Antonio Fini =

Antonio Fini (Villapiana, Italy, March 26, 1983), also known as Antonio Pio Fini, is an Italian born modern dancer, choreographer, and director. He is a principal dancer with Michael Mao Dance and the founder and artistic director of Fini Dance Festival and the Italian International Dance Award.

== Early life ==
Fini was born in Villapiana, a village in the south of Italy. At 19, he was discovered by Margherita Smirnova and offered a scholarship to Milan’s Centro Studi Coreografici Teatro Carcano where he studied under the direction of Aldo Masella and Renata Bestetti. While in Milan, Fini danced for Teatro Massimo di Palermo, I Giovani del Carcano, Talenti in Scena, and Balletto di Milano.

At the suggestion of the master Graham teacher Elena Albano, Fini traveled to New York to study at the Martha Graham Center of Contemporary Dance. While there, he was invited by the school's director, Marnie Thomas, to join the second company of The Martha Graham Dance Company and to continue studying on scholarship. In addition to performing with Graham II and Martha Graham Dance Company, Fini graduated from the school as a certified teacher of the Graham Technique.

== Career ==
After departing the Graham organization to experience other dance forms, Fini joined Erick Hawkins Dance Company, Kosovo Ballet, Staten Island Ballet, Boca Ballet Theatre, Mare Nostrum Elements, and Michael Mao Dance, with whom he has performed as principal dancer since 2011. In addition to his work as a dancer, Fini has collaborated extensively with the composer and musician, Noa Guy. This collaboration launched the second phase of Fini's career as a choreographer. After winning the Stefano Valentini Award for Emerging Choreographer in 2010, Fini would go on to choreograph Spider Dance for Cathedral of St. John the Divine, New York City Opera's production of I gioielli della Madonna, and Where the Light Falls for Kosovo Ballet.

In 2011, Fini created Alto Jonio Dance Festival in Villapiana, Calabria to provide exceptional dancers in Italy the opportunity to perform with established companies in New York. In 2013, he expanded his vision by founding the Italian International Dance Award, which recognizes phenomenal Italian and international dancers for their accomplishments. Since its inception, the award has been accepted by Alessandra Ferri, Elena Albano, Eugene Louis Faccuito, Edward Villella, Alessandra Corona, Petra Conti, Lorenzo Pagano, Greta Campo, and Jacqulyn Buglisi. In 2014 Alto Jonio was transformed into Fini Dance Festival with the mission of establishing greater connections between dancers in New York and Italy. The festivals have been listed as one of the top summer dance festivals in The United States (Dance Informa) and Europe (Ballet 2000).

Furthering his mission to unite the international dance community, Fini has developed a dance competition and mentorship program for television called The Audition. Distributed in partnership with Delta Star Pictures, the show will premiere in 2018 on Amazon Prime.

== Other work ==
Fini is a Fire Dancer and Reiki healer.

He has taught dance at the Martha Graham Center of Contemporary Dance, SLK Ballet School, Huntington Center of Performing Arts, and at numerous schools throughout Italy, in Spain, Switzerland, France, Kosovo, and Alaska.

== See also ==
- List of dancers
