= American Inventory =

1958 American TV program

- Genre: Educational
- Created by: William Hodapp
- Country of origin: United States
- No. of seasons: 5
- No. of episodes: 165

Production
- Producers: William Hodapp (1951-1954); Robert Wald (1954-1955)
- Running time: 30 minutes
- Production companies: Teleprograms, Inc.

Original release
- Network: NBC
- Release: July 1, 1951 – December 22, 1956

American Inventory is a thirty-minute weekly filmed educational series that first aired as a summer replacement Sunday nights during 1951 on NBC. It was funded by the Alfred P. Sloan Foundation with NBC donating the broadcast time and facilities. The series incorporated panel discussions, lectures from experts, film of activities and events taking place out of the studio, and occasional in-studio dramatic scenes. It was an ambitious project, the first educational series produced and broadcast by a network.

== Premise ==
Described as "adult education", the goal was to provide information to Americans about their own history and resources and issues facing them as a society. The first summer series would focus on social and economic questions. Later seasons would explore natural sciences and humanities. Many of the first episodes focused on contrasting life in authoritarian states, principally the Soviet Union, with the United States. Many episodes had a one-time host or narrator; there was no continuing position. Opening titles and closing credits were subdued, amounting to little more than one title card for the former and four or five for the latter; there was no "credit crawl". Guests were introduced orally on camera at beginning and end; only the principal crew were in the end credits.

Beginning in the summer of 1952 a new type of episode was featured, in which various professions were examined in a dramatised setting, under the collective title of "American Gallery". The following year NBC announced the show would now provide "Education and Entertainment", with an emphasis on dramas and musical performances. The musical emphasis trailed off in the spring of 1954; by the last season (1955) the series schedule was heavy with business-friendly anthology stories.

== Production ==
NBC was responsible for the content and supplied the production crew for creating the episodes. The NBC studio in Spanish Harlem was used, but episodes were also produced in other cities, such as Chicago where a mass Civil Defense exercise was recorded. The show's creator and producer was William "Bill" Hodapp from Louisville, Kentucky. He was executive producer at Teleprograms, Inc, (Note: A wholly-owned subsidiary of NBC, created for legal reasons.) which produced the show for NBC. According to one newspaper article, about 500 people were involved in staging each episode of the series. Visual effects more associated with movies than early television were created in the NBC studio. The production team was not concerned with smooth-flowing dialogue or actions, leading some to believe the show was aired live. There was often no film editor credited, and the show exhibited a feeling of having been shot once with minimal rehearsal.

The show began with an order for thirteen episodes, rather than the full 39 associated with season-driven series. Near the end of airing that first order the Sloan Foundation asked for more episodes. By late February 1952 the Sloan Foundation committed $140,000 (Note: Roughly equivalent to $1,600,000 in 2022.) for a second set of 39 episodes. The network broadcast took long breaks during the summer of 1952 while producer Bill Hodapp travelled to Europe with three camera crews for research and footage for upcoming shows. By the time the 75th episode aired during February 1953, the Sloan Foundation announced it had ordered another 39 episodes.

According to columnist John Crosby, one episode was filmed and broadcast in color on March 28, 1954. New production of the show ceased in April 1954 for up to five months when Hodapp left as producer, leaving NBC still owing the Sloan Foundation thirty-two episodes for the fourth season. After the fourth season finished up in March 1955, production again ceased until the short fifth season resumed in late summer of that year.

== Response ==
Critical response to the first episode ranged from discouraging to equivalence. Larry Wolters from the Chicago Tribune felt it was too analytical and dry, lacked inspiration and a proper ending. Ben Gross from the Daily News judged "although this promises to be a most interesting and worthwhile series, the opening episode was in no way superior to the average documentary". The Boston Globe reviewer also thought the first episode was "too abstract". However, the fourth episode, a panel discussion among health and emergency workers, filmed amid a massive Civil Defense exercise simulating a nuclear strike in the Chicago area, provoked a re-evaluation from the Boston Globe: "...the show was an excellent documentary, very well produced and guided by Clifton Utley".

Critical appreciation grew as the series went on. The show won an award from the Institute of Education, an annual conference at Ohio State University, during June 1952. Reviewer Bill Coleman at The Tablet called it a "worthwhile program which didn't get all the publicity it should have" in its debut season. The New York Times said American Inventory should be praised for its courage in devising new formats for presenting educational material almost every week, while acknowledging it sometimes didn't work.

== Broadcast history ==
Broadcast of the show began Sunday, July 1, 1951, at 7 pm Eastern time. Coverage was at first limited to the NBC network east of the Mississippi river. Some stations in Texas had a two-week delay in their viewing the premiere while AT&T technicians hooked broadcasting towers up to the private network lines. Gradually coverage expanded to the rest of the country, with subscribing stations not yet connected to the network receiving film reels. By October 1951 there were 63 stations receiving the series. Because it was a filmed series, not live, stations had the option to run it at different times, rather than accept the network feed. During the summer of 1951, NBC switched the network broadcast to 1:30 pm Eastern time. At the end of March 1952 there was a two-week hiatus during which repeats of earlier programs were broadcast. There was a monthlong hiatus for the network broadcast during June 1952, followed by two new episodes then another monthlong break until early August. Meanwhile, the network kept moving the broadcast time every few months, from afternoons to evenings and back again.

A six-month hiatus of new broadcasts occurred from April through mid-September 1954 after creator-producer Bill Hodapp left the show. Another break occurred in April 1955 when NBC removed American Inventory from its Sunday schedule. It was brought back for a single broadcast on May 22, 1955, but remained off the air until September 18, 1955.

The final show of the series was first broadcast December 25, 1955. However, many stations hadn't yet run thru their inventory of episodes. There was a sharp fall-off of stations carrying the show in January 1956, followed by a long decrease thru May 1956. The last station that ran the show was KFAR-TV in Fairbanks, Alaska, where it aired thru December 1956.

== Episodes ==
The tables below are separated into "seasons" by either production orders from the Sloan Foundation (where known) or long breaks in the broadcasting schedule. Its unknown if there was any acknowledgement of seasonal debuts or distinctions on the show. Original air date is for the network feed; some stations were two weeks or more behind in their broadcasts. "Guests" is used in place of "Cast" except where the episode was known to be dramatised.

=== Season 1 (1951-52) ===
No. overall	No. in season	Title	Directed by	Written by	Original release date
1	1	"American Testament"	Unknown	Wade Arnold	July 1, 1951
Hostess Gladys Swarthout performs Sing, America. Guests speak about their faith in America to film accompaniment. Guests: Charles F. Kettering, Samuel Liebowitz, Gertrude Grover (housewife), Jackie Robinson
2	2	"What Ever Happened to the Dollar?"	Unknown	Budd Fishel	July 8, 1951
A "living newspaper" and ballet dancer Dorothy Jarnac provide motion to sequences of speakers talking about inflation from 1930 through to 1951. Guests:
3	3	"The Waste in Crime"	Unknown	Unknown	July 15, 1951
Labelled by NBC as a "Kefauver type investigation", it explored the role of everyone in crime and corruption. Guests:
4	4	"Would There Be Panic If Atom Bombs Fell on This Country?"	Unknown	Unknown	July 22, 1951
Clifton Utley narrates as guests discuss civil defense and medical emergency questions, amid a massive Civil Defense exercise in Chicago. Guests: J. V. Sidney, Dr. Ozro Woods, Dr. A. C. Ivy
5	5	"Behind the Iron Curtain"	Unknown	Unknown	July 29, 1951
Four Soviet refugees and four US citizens have a panel discussion. Guests: Yuri Glassov (teacher), Dr. Vasili Fursin, Lillia Bitak (librarian), Boris Tavolga (actor); Ada Siegel moderates and translates; Dr. Frederick S. Dick, Anne Seymour, Wycliffe McCracken (teacher)
6	6	"The Early Years"	Unknown	Unknown	August 5, 1951
Examination of parent-child interactions. Guests: Dr. Myrtle McGraw
7	7	"The Middle Years"	Unknown	Unknown	August 12, 1951
Parents adjust to the "empty nest". Guests: Dr. Lena Levine
8	8	"The Later Years"	Unknown	Unknown	August 19, 1951
Problems affecting people as they age. Guests: Dr. Louis I. Dublin
9	9	"Opportunity Unlimited"	Unknown	Unknown	August 26, 1951
Achievements in science and industry drive opportunity for young Americans. Guests: Kenneth Nelson, John Reedy
10	10	"U.S. Dieway Number One"	Unknown	Unknown	September 2, 1951
Ways to reduce auto accidents. Guests:
11	11	"That Men May Know"	Unknown	Unknown	September 9, 1951
How authoritarian governments force confessions from the innocent. Guests:
12	12	"Previews of Progress"	Unknown	Unknown	September 16, 1951
A "scientific stage show" presented by General Motors is the subject. (Note: The Sloan Foundation, which financed this series, was created by longtime General Motors President and CEO Alfred P. Sloan.) Guests: John Reedy
13	13	"Honor in Our Colleges"	Unknown	Unknown	September 23, 1951
Panel discussion in the wake of a cheating scandal at West Point. Guests: Mildred McAfee Horton, Bo McMillin, John Daly
14	14	"The Control of Climate"	Unknown	Unknown	September 30, 1951
Scientist from General Electric does lab demonstrations of climate control. Guests: Dr. Vincent Schaefer
15	15	TBA	Unknown	Unknown	October 7, 1951
Guests:
16	16	"Another American Revolution"	Unknown	Unknown	October 14, 1951
Story of Eli Whitney's mass production methods. Guests:
17	17	"Drawing Conclusions"	Unknown	Unknown	October 21, 1951
Guests:
18	18	"The Greener Grass"	Unknown	Unknown	October 28, 1951
Guests:
19	19	"Medical Education, 1951"	Unknown	Unknown	November 4, 1951
Documents medical training including film of a heart operation. Guests: Hospital staff and patients
20	20	"The Peaceful Atom"	Unknown	Unknown	November 11, 1951
Peaceful use of atomic energy in farming, medicene, and industry. Guests:
21	21	"Thanksgiving 1951"	Unknown	Unknown	November 18, 1951
Documents refugees from other countries now in America. Guests:
22	22	"One in Twelve"	Unknown	Unknown	November 25, 1951
Dramatized jury deliberation illustrates the justice system. Cast:
23	23	"Aerial Railroad Tracks"	Unknown	Unknown	December 2, 1951
Guests:
24	24	"Leaders of Our Choice"	Unknown	Unknown	December 9, 1951
Dramatized story of union members voting out an unsuitable leader. Cast:
25	25	"Economics of Gambling"	Unknown	Unknown	December 16, 1951
Guests:
26	26	"A Christmas Journey"	Unknown	Unknown	December 23, 1951
Dance fantasy of what people really want for Christmas, performed by Wisconsin dancers. Cast: Robin Gregory, Mary Hinkson, Matt Turney, Muriel Levinsohn Cole, Marion Lawrence, Sue Hackes
27	27	TBA	Unknown	Unknown	December 30, 1951
Guests:
28	28	"The Eisenhower Mission (Note: Some sources have this episode titled as "Defense in the West".)"	Unknown	Unknown	January 6, 1952
The founding of SHAPE, NATO's military command headquarters. Guests:
29	29	"The American Scene"	Unknown	Unknown	January 13, 1952
The country as revealed through art. Guests:
30	30	"Present Danger"	Unknown	Unknown	January 20, 1952
Panel discussion on state of Korean War. Guests:
31	31	"The You in UNESCO"	Unknown	Unknown	January 27, 1952
Playwright reports on his world trip to highlight human rights thru drama. Guests: Paul Green
32	32	"A Letter Home"	Unknown	Unknown	February 3, 1952
G.I. stationed in Europe reports on his life there. Guests:
33	33	"Postmark: USA"	Unknown	Unknown	February 10, 1952
Father writes to G.I. son stationed overseas. Guests:
34	34	"Saving"	Unknown	Unknown	February 17, 1952
Popular puppet act Kukla, Fran, and Ollie talk about the value of saving. Guests: Fran Allison, Burr Tillstrom (voice only)
35	35	"Every Man"	Unknown	Unknown	February 24, 1952
Program to highlight National Brotherhood Week. Guests:
36	36	"The Truth about Science Fiction"	Unknown	Unknown	March 2, 1952
This was about the possibility of space travel, not the literary genre. Guests:
37	37	"Our Stake in Europe"	Unknown	Unknown	March 9, 1952
Panel discussion about US commitment to Europe. Guests: John J. McCloy, Jean Monnet, John J. Sparkman, Henry Cassidy

=== Season 2 (1952-53) ===
No. overall	No. in season	Title	Directed by	Written by	Original release date
38	1	"The Road to Mental Health"	Unknown	Unknown	March 30, 1952
Millions of Americans were believed to be suffering from mental afflictions. Guests:
39	2	"Your Insurance Dollar"	Unknown	Unknown	April 6, 1952
Dramatised presentation using puppets to highlight economic importance of insurance. Cast: Remo Bufano Marionettes
40	3	"Biography Book"	Unknown	Unknown	April 13, 1952
Dramatised account of botanist George Washington Carver. Cast: Canada Lee (Carver), (Note: This was his last performance; he died of a heart attack less than a month later.) Canada Lee Jr. (Tuskegee student)
41	4	"Star-Crossed"	Unknown	Unknown	April 20, 1952
"Folk Opera" version of Romeo and Juliet, set in the Kentucky hills, composed by John Jacob Niles. Cast: Kenneth Nelson (Rome Morgan), Vera Massey (Julie Cunliff).
42	5	"The Whistle at Eaton Falls"	Unknown	Unknown	April 27, 1952
Adaption of The Whistle at Eaton Falls about labor and management issues. Cast:
43	6	TBA	Unknown	Unknown	May 4, 1952
Radioactive isotopes used in medicine are shown at Brookhaven National Laboratory. Guests:
44	7	"The College of Free Europe"	Unknown	Unknown	May 11, 1952
Film of the newly created Overseas University in Europe. Guests:
45	8	"The Election of Abraham Lincoln"	Unknown	Unknown	May 18, 1952
A prospective pilot for a series on Lincoln compares elections of 1860 and 1952. Cast: Crahan Denton (Lincoln)
46	9	"Safety in Numbers"	Unknown	Unknown	May 25, 1952
Musical comedy conveys ideas for staying safe on the highway. Cast:
47	10	"The Lawyer"	Unknown	Unknown	June 29, 1952
The show returned from a four week break to feature a short play, the first in the "American Gallery". Cast: Michael Strong, Pat Englund, Robert Ludlum, Jon Richards
48	11	TBA	Unknown	Unknown	July 6, 1952
Panel discussion about what goes on during American political conventions. Guests: Theodore Granik (moderator), Everett Dirksen, Paul Douglas
49	12	"Cop on the Beat"	Unknown	Howard Whitman	August 10, 1952
Dramatised story about beat cops being replaced by patrol cars leading to rise in local hoodlums. Cast: Howard Whitman (narrator)
50	13	"Helping People Abroad"	Unknown	Unknown	August 17, 1952
How the American Express Company works to help tourists in Europe. Guests:
51	14	"What Makes Us Tick?"	Unknown	Unknown	August 24, 1952
An informal cocktail party setting allowed for a question and answer session on the New York Stock Exchange. Guests: John McCaffery (host), Mary Roebling, Harry Comer (stock broker), Leora Dana, Frank Gallop
52	15	"Friend of the Worker"	Unknown	Unknown	August 31, 1952
How working conditions differ between East Berlin and West Berlin. Guests:
53	16	TBA	Unknown	Unknown	September 7, 1952
Guests:
54	17	"Freedom for Information"	Unknown	Unknown	September 14, 1952
Panel discussion from National Press Club with editors and bureau chiefs. Guests: Lockwood Doty (moderator), Russell Wiggins, Clark Mollenhoff, Kenneth Dixon, Carroll Binder, Col. Edward M. Kirby, George Sandeffer
55	18	"Foreign Students in the U.S."	Unknown	Unknown	September 21, 1952
Poorly received episode was solely about foreign students at MIT. Guests: George Barnes (narrator)
56	19	"Why Wait for a Million"	Unknown	Unknown	September 28, 1952
Guests:
57	20	TBA	Unknown	Unknown	October 5, 1952
Guests:
58	21	"Unfinished Rainbows"	Unknown	Unknown	October 12, 1952
Story of a young inventor's perseverance. Cast: Alan Ladd
59	22	"The Opening of a Door"	Unknown	Unknown	October 19, 1952
Dramatised tale about the Community Chest Red Feather campaign. Cast:
60	23	"Another Look at the Atom"	Unknown	Unknown	October 26, 1952
The show goes inside an atomic power plant. Guests:
61	24	"Community Theater"	Unknown	Unknown	November 2, 1952
A look at community theater thru the Cleveland Play House. Guests:
62	25	TBA	Unknown	Unknown	November 9, 1952
Guests:
63	26	"Let's Go, America"	Unknown	Unknown	November 16, 1952
Railroads in America, as seen by a young girl travelling 8500 miles by rail. Guests: Mary Lee Dearring
64	27	TBA	Unknown	Unknown	November 23, 1952
Guests:
65	28	TBA	Unknown	Unknown	November 30, 1952
Guests:
66	29	TBA	Unknown	Unknown	December 7, 1952
Guests:
67	30	"Joy in Singing"	Unknown	Unknown	December 14, 1952
New methods for teaching singing are demonstrated at Town Hall in Manhattan. Guests:
68	31	"A Decision at Christmas"	Unknown	Unknown	December 21, 1952
Dramatised story. Cast:
69	32	"Social Security"	Unknown	Unknown	December 28, 1952
Guests:
70	33	"Private American Investments Abroad"	Unknown	Unknown	January 4, 1953
Guests:
71	34	"What Is It?"	Unknown	Unknown	January 11, 1953
Quiz show format is adopted for inventions that have changed the country. Guests:
72	35	"Council of Europe"	Unknown	Unknown	January 18, 1953
Panel discussion on what the Council of Europe means for Americans. Guests:
73	36	"Your Credit's Good"	Unknown	Unknown	January 25, 1953
Development of monetary and credits systems up to current day. Guests:
74	37	TBA	Unknown	Unknown	February 1, 1953
Guests:
75	38	"The Schuman Plan"	Unknown	Unknown	February 8, 1953
Footage filmed in Europe. Guests:
76	39	"The Michigan Heart"	Unknown	Unknown	February 15, 1953
A mechanical heart kept sixteen year-old patient alive during valve repair surgery. Guests: Charles Moses (patient), Dr. F. D. Dodrill (inventor)

=== Season 3 (1953-54) ===
No. overall	No. in season	Title	Directed by	Written by	Original release date
77	1	"American Tourist"	Unknown	Unknown	February 22, 1953
Travelogue of film shot in Western Europe by NBC camera crew. Guests:
78	2	TBA	Unknown	Unknown	March 1, 1953
Another American Gallery story, this time about the family doctor. Cast:
79	3	"The Atom in Industry"	Unknown	Unknown	March 8, 1953
Scientist from General Electric discusses uses of atomic energy. Guests: Dr. Kenneth Kingdon
80	4	"Value of Art as Therapy"	Unknown	Unknown	March 15, 1953
Artists in several media discuss healing power of art. Guests: Milton Caniff (Note: The original air date is conjectural, as the only source was a station not on the network feed.)
81	5	TBA	Unknown	Unknown	March 22, 1953
Guests:
82	6	"Cancer, A Research Story"	Unknown	Unknown	March 29, 1953
State of cancer research with five experts; included child leukemia patient who died a week before show aired. Guests: Dr. Charles S. Cameron (narrator), Bruce H. Knight (patient), Dr. Louis Finkelstein
83	7	"Linneaus"	Unknown	Unknown	April 5, 1953
This was a drama about the 18th Century Swedish botanist, Carl von Linne. Cast:
84	8	TBA	Unknown	Unknown	April 12, 1953
Guests:
85	9	"How to Get Rich"	Unknown	Unknown	April 19, 1953
This was about how the country became wealthy compared to other nations. Guests:
86	10	"Live and Let Live"	Unknown	Unknown	April 26, 1953
Human internal organs are shown in motion through a fluoroscope. Guests:
87	11	"What Is It?"	Unknown	Unknown	May 3, 1953
The second episode with this title and quiz show format on American inventions. Guests: Roland Young
88	12	TBA	Unknown	Unknown	May 10, 1953
Guests:
89	13	"Our Merchant Marine"	Unknown	Unknown	May 17, 1953
How the service operates and its value for the country. Guests:
90	14	"Road to Television"	Unknown	Unknown	May 24, 1953
Students at Columbia University trace the development of television. Guests:
91	15	"Highway Safety"	Unknown	Unknown	May 31, 1953
The Sloan Foundation presents awards for highway safety at its annual conference. Guests:
92	16	"Education by Television"	Unknown	Unknown	June 7, 1953
Panel discussion on using television for education. Guests: Gilbert Seldes (moderator), Justin Miller, Charles R. Farnsley, Sigmund Spaeth, Dr. I. Keith Tyler
93	17	"Crossroads, U.S.A."	Unknown	Unknown	June 14, 1953
Presentation advising young students to major in science and engineering. Guests: Charles F. Kettering, John Reedy, Bill Cobb
94	18	TBA	Unknown	Unknown	June 21, 1953
Highlights of the past season's episodes before long summer break. Guests: Bill Hodapp
95	19	"American Song"	Unknown	Unknown	September 13, 1953
Series resumed after summer break with a history of popular American songs. Guests: Sigmund Spaeth, Betty Johnson
96	20	"Your Auto I.Q."	Unknown	Unknown	September 20, 1953
Another quiz show format episode, this time on old automaobiles. Guests: Faye Emerson
97	21	"Space Travel"	Unknown	Unknown	September 27, 1953
Inventor and author discusses the possibility of space travel. Guests: Will Jenkins
98	22	TBA	Unknown	Unknown	October 4, 1953
Guests:
99	23	"Report from Three Cities"	Unknown	Unknown	October 11, 1953
How the Bronx, Chicago, and Baltimore each handled a civic emergency. Guests:
100	24	TBA	Unknown	Unknown	October 18, 1953
Guests:
101	25	"The Story of Dorothy Sprague"	Unknown	Unknown	October 25, 1953
The role of women's auxiliaries in hospitals is examined. Guests:
102	26	"American Song"	Unknown	Unknown	November 1, 1953
Spirituals, blues, and jazz songs with vocalist, piano, and an academic. Guests: Ethel Waters, Reginald Beane (pianist), Sigmund Spaeth
103	27	"From Out of Darkness"	Unknown	Unknown	November 8, 1953
Drama produced in Chicago, it examines failure of a marriage due to mental health issues. Cast:
104	28	"American Fair"	Unknown	Unknown	November 15, 1953
Film of the New York State Fair from August 1953. Guests:
105	29	"Some Things to Be Thankful for"	Unknown	Unknown	November 22, 1953
Thanksgiving with the actor and his family. Guests: Eddie Albert, Margo Albert, Edward Albert
106	30	"The Social Worker"	Unknown	Unknown	November 29, 1953
Another in the series of American Gallery dramas. Cast:
107	31	"Those Extra Years"	Unknown	Unknown	December 6, 1953
The individual problems arising from Americans living longer. Guests:
108	32	"The Teacher"	Unknown	Unknown	December 13, 1953
Follows the training of an elementary school teacher. Guests: Frances Horwich (narrator)
109	33	"American Carols"	Unknown	Unknown	December 20, 1953
Christmas carols in America, from Colonial times on. Guests: Sigmund Spaeth, Chorus
110	34	"Highlights Show"	Unknown	Unknown	December 27, 1953
Highlights of three recent episodes: The Teacher, American Fair, and The Story of Dorothy Sprague. Guests:
111	35	"The Library"	Unknown	Unknown	January 3, 1954
Panel discussion of library services in American communities. Guests: Cornelia Otis Skinner, William S. Dix, Ralph Beals (NYPL), Florence Ludington (ALA President)
112	36	"Time on Our Hands"	Unknown	Unknown	January 10, 1954
Modern leisure activities including hobbies, crafts, and arts. Guests:
113	37	TBA	Unknown	Unknown	January 17, 1954
National Printing Week and Benjamin Franklin are celebrated. Guests:
114	38	"The Country Editor"	Unknown	Unknown	January 24, 1954
American Gallery drama about small-town newspaper editor Ellsworth Coe. Cast: Russell Hardie (Coe)
115	39	"American Folk Music"	Unknown	Unknown	January 31, 1954
Origins of American folk music is discussed and shown in performances. Guests: John Jacob Niles (host), Sonny Terry, Cisco Houston, Lolita Cuevas

=== Season 4 (1954-55) ===
No. overall	No. in season	Title	Directed by	Written by	Original release date
116	1	"Schools"	Unknown	Unknown	February 7, 1954
Panel discussion on building new public schools. Guests: Henry Cassidy (moderator), Ralph W. Gwinn, Walter Cocking, Lawrence Perkins, Archibald D. Shaw, Donald V. Buttenheim
117	2	TBA	Unknown	Unknown	February 21, 1954 (Note: The show was pre-empted on February 14, 1954)
Program focusing on the Chicago Field Museum. Guests:
118	3	"A Look at the Future"	Unknown	Unknown	February 28, 1954
New developments in science and industry are discussed. Guests:
119	4	"America's Faith"	Unknown	Unknown	March 7, 1954
Prominent people discuss the importance of faith in their lives. Guests: Peggy Wood, Conrad Hilton
120	5	"Careers for Youth"	Unknown	Unknown	March 14, 1954
High school students quiz guests about careers. Guests: Millicent C. McIntosh, Charles H. Sawyer, William Briston, Col. Oliver J. Troster
121	6	"The Public Health Officer"	Unknown	Unknown	March 21, 1954
American Gallery drama about an officer in the PHSCC. Cast:
121	7	"Botanical Gardens"	Unknown	Unknown	March 28, 1954
Plant diversity and uses for gardening, farming, and aesthetics. (Note: This episode was filmed and broadcast in color.) Guests:
122	8	"The Small College"	Unknown	Unknown	September 19, 1954 (Note: The series returned to the air after a six-month break.)
The importance of small liberal arts colleges to America. Guests:
123	9	"The Modern Farmer"	Unknown	Unknown	September 26, 1954
Future Farmers of America and 4-H clubs contribution to the farming profession. Guests:
124	10	"The Convention Story"	Unknown	Unknown	October 3, 1954
Husband brings wife along to a business convention. Guests:
125	11	TBA	Unknown	Unknown	October 10, 1954
The ways in which local banks aid their communities. Guests:
126	12	"From Kitty Hawk"	Unknown	Unknown	October 17, 1954
A history of American aviation. Guests:
127	13	"New Hope for Cancer Research"	Unknown	Unknown	October 24, 1954
Guests:
128	14	"Heaven on Earth"	Unknown	Unknown	October 31, 1954
Dramatised story of insurance scam preying on older men. Cast:
129	15	"The Mousetrap"	Unknown	Unknown	November 7, 1954
Craftsman refuses to innovate until forced by competition. Cast: Elliott Reid, Cliff Carpenter, Russell Hicks
130	16	"City in Distress"	Unknown	Unknown	November 14, 1954
A city suffers a financial crisis. Guests:
131	17	"The Island of Langerhans (Note: This is the teleplay title as given in newspapers though obviously the Islets of Langerhans is meant.)"	Unknown	Unknown	November 21, 1954
Frederick G. Banting and the discovery of insulin. Guests:
132	18	"The Last Mail"	Unknown	Unknown	November 28, 1954
A former soldier searches for a lost letter. Guests: Frank C. Baxter, Pat Harrington
133	19	"Horizons of Hope"	Unknown	Unknown	December 5, 1954
The first fully-animated episode is about progress in fighting Cancer.
134	20	"Red Alert"	Unknown	Unknown	December 12, 1954
Role of ground spotters in early detection of hostile aircraft. Guests:
135	21	"Men of the Forest"	Jackie Cooper	Unknown	December 19, 1954
Drama of dispute between cattle rancher and forest ranger. Cast: John O'Hara, Mary Lou Taylor, Joe Brown Jr.
136	22	"In the Silent House"	Unknown	Unknown	December 26, 1954
Dramatised life of deaf-blind poet Laura Bridgman. Cast:
137	23	"The 13 Million"	Unknown	Unknown	January 2, 1955
The increasing number of over 65 year-olds in America. Guests:
138	24	"Start Counting Slowly"	Unknown	Unknown	January 9, 1955
Dramatised story about artificial respiration during surgery. Cast:
139	25	"The Right Man"	Unknown	Unknown	January 16, 1955
Guests:
140	26	"The Willing and the Able"	Unknown	Unknown	January 23, 1955
Dramatised story of disabled man striving to earn a living. Cast: Martin Balsam, Donald Buka, Santos Ortega
141	27	"Tilly, Get Down From Your Wagon"	Unknown	Unknown	January 30, 1955
Dramatised story of trying to make a living as a writer. Cast:
142	28	"The Beautiful Endurance"	Unknown	Unknown	February 6, 1955
Guests:
143	29	"This Business of Living"	Unknown	Unknown	February 13, 1955
Dramatised story of student nurse reconsidering her profession. Cast: Lori March
144	30	"The Doodlebrain"	Unknown	Unknown	February 20, 1955
Dramatised story of the value of creative innovation. Cast:
145	31	"Drop Out"	Unknown	Unknown	February 27, 1955
How teachers can reach the problem student. Guests:
146	32	"The Human Equation"	Unknown	Unknown	March 6, 1955
Guests:
147	33	"Everybody's Business"	Unknown	Unknown	March 13, 1955
Dramatised story of a young couple's success as small investors in the stock market. Cast:
148	34	"Cause for Alarm"	Unknown	Unknown	March 20, 1955
Dramatised story about handling juvenile delinquencey by providing work training. Cast:
149	35	TBA	Unknown	Unknown	March 27, 1955
Guests:
150	36	"Second Chance"	Unknown	Unknown	May 22, 1955
Drama about a mayor who overenforces traffic laws after a hit-and-run. Cast:

=== Season 5 (1955) ===
No. overall	No. in season	Title	Directed by	Written by	Original release date
151	1	"Roadblock"	Unknown	Edgar Marvin	September 18, 1955
Drama about retired doctor's campaign against development in a small town. Cast: Wendell Holmes
152	2	"The Days Grow Long"	Unknown	Unknown	September 25, 1955
Drama about caring for the elderly. Cast: Carmen Mathews, Nelson Olmsted, P. J. Kelly
153	3	TBA	Unknown	Unknown	October 2, 1955
Guests:
154	4	"Middle Ground"	Unknown	Unknown	October 9, 1955
Drama about mediator who helps settle trucker's strike. Cast: Luis van Rooten
155	5	"The Square Peg"	Unknown	Unknown	October 16, 1955
Drama about son's career choice angering father. Cast:
156	6	"Routine Emergency"	Unknown	Unknown	October 23, 1955
Administrator and surgeon put aside differences to help child patient. Cast:
157	7	"Majority of One"	Unknown	Unknown	October 30, 1955
Drama about science vs. humanities in a college. Cast: Martyn Green, Ethel Wilson
158	8	TBA	Unknown	Unknown	November 6, 1955
Guests:
159	9	"The Sun Watchers"	Unknown	Unknown	November 13, 1955
Drama about long range weather forecasting. Cast: Biff McGuire, Pat Bosley
160	10	"The Ounce and the Pound"	Unknown	Unknown	November 20, 1955
Drama about an educator raising awareness of mental health issues in small town. Cast: Cliff Carpenter
161	11	TBA	Unknown	Unknown	November 27, 1955
Guests
162	12	"Calculated Risk"	Unknown	Unknown	December 4, 1955
Drama about a small business.
163	13	"In These Hands"	Unknown	Edgar Marvin	December 11, 1955
Drama about inner thoughts of surgical team during an operation. Cast: House Jameson, John Larkin, Patricia Wheel, Leon Janney, Charme Allen, Tom Collins, Beverley Lawrence, James Stephens, Tom Holland, Roy Fant
164	14	"Survival of the Fittest"	Unknown	Unknown	December 18, 1955
Drama about ethics and responsibility of a business owner. Cast:
165	15	"Christmas Belongs to Children"	Unknown	Unknown	December 25, 1955
(Final episode) Marionettes tell story about the holiday in a typical community. Cast: Margot Moppets
