= Masha Dashkina Maddux =

Ukrainian modern dancer

Mariya "Masha" Dashkina Maddux is a Ukrainian modern dancer and dance teacher. She is a former principal dancer with the Martha Graham Dance Company and is the founder and director of the Wake Forest Dance Festival.

== Early life and education ==
Mariya Dashkina Maddux was born in Kyiv, Ukraine. As a child she studied classical ballet, training in the Vaganova method. She moved to the United States as a young adult and studied under Ruth Weisen at the Thomas Armour Youth Ballet in Miami, Florida. She graduated from New World School of the Arts.

== Career ==
In 2007 Dashkina Maddux joined the Martha Graham Dance Company in New York City and was eventually promoted to the rank of principal dancer. She performed in many lead roles in Graham works including the Bride in Appalachian Spring, Ariadne in Errand into the Maze, Woman in Red in Diversion of Angels, Eve in Embattled Garden, the duet Conversation of Lovers, and danced featured roles in Deaths and Entrances, Leader of Steps in the Street from Chronicle, Leader of the Chorus in Night Journey, Artemis in Phaedra, and the solo Serenata Morisca. Along with Graham works, Dashkina Maddux also performed works by contemporary choreographers including Larry Keigwin, Richard Move, Luca Veggetti, Lar Lubovitch, Bulareyaung Pagarlava, Adonis Foniadakis, Anna Sokolow, Robert Wilson, and Azure Barton. She was featured in a Martha Graham Technique instructional video for beginners that was directed by Miki Orihara and Susan Kikuchi and produced by Dance Spotlight.

She has been featured in Dance Magazine, Dior Magazine, Broadway Dance Magazine, and was in the film Fall to Rise, directed by Jayce Bartok. She has also modeled for dance photographers and was featured in the books Dessert Flower by Guillermo Licurgo and The Art of Movement by Ken Browar and Deborah Ory.

Dashkina Maddux has taught ballet and modern dance at the Martha Graham Center of Contemporary Dance, the New World School of the Arts, Thomas Armour Youth Ballet, the University of North Carolina at Greensboro, Elon University, and Colburn School of Los Angeles. In 2017 she founded the Wake Forest Dance Festival, a public dance festival presented by ARTS Wake Forest and in partnership with the Wake Forest Department of Parks and Recreations, and serves as its director.

She is an ambassador for Dancing Angels Foundation, a non-profit scholarship foundation for dancer students.

In 2018, she was a recipient of the Alto Jonio Best Dancer Award.
