= Terese Capucilli =

American modern dancer

Terese Capucilli is an American modern dancer, interpreter of the roles originally performed by Martha Graham. She is one of the last generation of dancers to be coached and directed by Graham herself. A principal dancer with the Martha Graham Dance Company for twenty-six years, she became associate artistic director in 1997 and from 2002 to 2005 served as artistic director, with Christine Dakin, seeing the organization and its dancers through the rebirth of the company. A driving force of Graham's work for nearly three decades, she is now Artistic Director Laureate.

== Early years ==
Born in Syracuse, New York, the middle child in a family of seven children, Capucilli received her Bachelor of Fine Arts degree from the State University of New York at Purchase where she studied with such prominent teachers as Kazuko Hirabayashi, Carol Fried, Mel Wong, Jim May, Aaron Osborne, Bill Bales, Rosanna Seravalli, Anne Parsons and Royes Fernandez. There she had the opportunity to delve into the work of choreographers, Martha Graham, Anna Sokolow, Mel Wong, Kazuko Hirabayashi, José Limón and Doris Humphrey. In 1978, upon graduation, she was offered a scholarship at the Martha Graham Center of Contemporary Dance and asked to join the Martha Graham Dance Company in March 1979. That same year she was one of four performers chosen to dance in honor of Martha Graham in the CBS-TV presentation of the Kennedy Center Honors. The following year, in the featured role of Young Clytemnestra she was partnered by Rudolf Nureyev at the Metropolitan Opera House in New York City.

== Career ==
In the years to follow, Capucilli became a prominent figure on the Graham stage, touring the world and performing in all of Graham's major work. Dancing a diversity of roles, they include Jocasta in Night Journey, The Bride in Appalachian Spring, The Principal Sister in Deaths and Entrances, She Who Dances in Letter to the World (with Kathleen Turner as She Who Speaks), Hecuba in Cortege of Eagles, Joan in Seraphic Dialogue, Mary Queen of Scots in Episodes, She Who Seeks in Dark Meadow, Medea in Cave of the Heart, Empress of the Arena in Every Soul is a Circus, The Virgin in Primitive Mysteries, The Woman in Errand into the Maze, the title roles in Hérodiade, Phaedra, Heretic, and Judith and Graham's classic solo, Lamentation, among others. Roles created for Capucilli include The Chosen One in The Rite of Spring, Crescent Moon in Temptations of the Moon and the lead role in Graham's final ballet Maple Leaf Rag.

Graham's 1937 solo, Deep Song, was reconstructed for her in 1988 and in the years to follow, Capucilli continued to be instrumental in the research and reconstruction of many early Graham solos, bringing to the stage Salem Shore, (performed with, and narrated by Claire Bloom) and not seen since 1947, and "Spectre-1914", from the 1936 work Chronicle, last performed by Martha Graham in 1938. She assisted Sophie Maslow in the reconstruction of its final section, "Prelude to Action", becoming historically the first dancer after Martha Graham to perform this work as well as Deep Song and "Spectre-1914". Lecturing often on the nature of the reconstructive process, she has since developed lectures delving deeply into the journey of the interpretive artist.

On film, she danced Errand into the Maze in An Evening of Dance and Conversation with Martha Graham for WNET and for Tokyo's NHK, where she also filmed the "Lament" from Acts of Light. At the Paris Opera, she filmed Maple Leaf Rag. In works choreographed for the Graham Company, roles were created for her by Twyla Tharp (Demeter and Persephone), Robert Wilson (Snow on the Mesa), and Lucinda Childs (Histoire). Capucilli appeared in historic performances in 1987 of Appalachian Spring dancing the role of The Bride to Mikhail Baryshnikov's Husbandman and Rudolf Nureyev's Preacher and was invited in 1988 to perform Errand into the Maze at the Soviet-American Making Music Together festival in Boston. She was partnered again by Baryshnikov in Graham's Night Journey (at the 1989 ABT/Graham Gala at the MET) and in 1991, El Penitente at City Center. subsequently touring the work with Baryshnikov's White Oak Dance Project in Paris and London. Capucilli was invited by Vanessa Redgrave to perform in UNICEF's The Return festival in art-starved Pristina, Kosovo, in 1999.

Capucilli is an associate founder and dancer of Buglisi Dance Theatre (formerly Buglisi/Foreman Dance) a company formed with colleagues Jacqulyn Buglisi, Donlin Foreman and Christine Dakin. Since 1991, she has collaborated in numerous works choreographed for her including Runes of the Heart, Threshold, Field of Loves, Suspended Woman, Requiem, Frida, and the solo, Against All Odd, an 11-minute tour de force on Sarah Bernhardt. Appearances have included the Joyce Theater; the Kennedy Center; San Marino Stage, Italy; Melbourne Festival; the Jacob's Pillow Festival; Teatro Nuovo in Milan, Italy with Carla Fracci's Italian Ballet; Prague's International Dance Week '93; Kaatsbaan; seven guest appearances at the Chautauqua Institution; Oriente-Occidente Festival 2009 in Rovereto, Italy, and residences throughout the world. She appears in eleven BDT works commissioned for filming by the New York Public Library for the Performing Arts.

Capucilli serves on the faculty of the Juilliard School and in 2008 she staged and directed Martha Graham's Appalachian Spring for the department's annual Spring Dances. Ten years prior, Capucilli had set and coached the Colorado Ballet in Graham's Appalachian Spring, which marked the first time in history that this classic work was performed by any company other than Martha Graham's. Highly sought after as a teacher and lecturer, Capucilli recently collaborated in launching danz.fest, the first international summer school/dance festival in Cattolica, Italy, now in its third year. The program brings together for the first time the classical ballet of the Paris Opera, the technique of Martha Graham and Butoh dance philosophy taught by the masters of their art to young dancers through the professional level.

She is featured in photographs by Lisa Levart and Martha Swope in Donlin Foreman's book Out of Martha's House. In 1999 she was invited by Susan Sontag and Annie Leibovitz to be photographed for Leibovitz's book Women and for her Pirelli Calendar series. Capucilli is a recipient of a 1985/86 dance fellowship from the Princess Grace Foundation-USA and the following year was awarded the Princess Grace Statuette. In 2001 Capucilli was honored with the Dance Magazine Award and, in 2010, with the Presidential Distinguished Alumni Award from Purchase College. Capucilli received a Lifetime Achievement Award from the Fini International Dance Festival in 2016.

A Special Projects Grant from the Princess Grace Foundation—USA was awarded to Capucilli in 2014 in support of her film, Lawrence 'Reed' Hansen: The Sacrosanct Accompanist—a musical journey through Martha Graham's dance technique. Produced, directed and co-edited by Capucilli it was filmed at The Juilliard School and The Martha Graham School in NYC documenting Hansen's vast knowledge of Martha Graham's physical language. The only film of its kind, it takes the viewer into the spontaneous triangular energy of teacher, dancer and accompanist in the dance classroom and is filmed, uncommonly, from the accompanist point of view. It is a portrait of the artist as well as an educational tool taking the viewer through Graham's floor work, which is so vital to the technique. The Juilliard School awarded her The John Erskine Faculty Prize 2017 for her work to archive the film and its raw materials.
