= Carolyn Adams =

Carolyn Adams may refer to:

- Carolyn Garcia, née Adams, American Merry Prankster and former wife of Jerry Garcia
- Carolyn Adams (dancer) American dancer, choreographer, and teacher
