= Maple Leaf Rag (ballet) =

1990 ballet by Martha Graham

Maple Leaf Rag is a storyless Martha Graham ballet set to ragtime compositions by Scott Joplin. The work premiered on October 2, 1990 at New York City Center with costumes by Calvin Klein and lighting by David Finley. Chris Landriau arranged the music and played piano at the debut. The dance is a jubilant self-parody and an homage, of sorts, to Graham's mentor and musical director, Louis Horst, who would play the rag for her whenever she fell into a creative slump. Graham was 96 when she created Maple Leaf Rag; it is her last completed dance. In 1991, she began another work, The Eyes of the Goddess, but it was unfinished at the time of her death.

== Synopsis ==
The curtain rises to reveal a grand piano at the rear of a darkened stage. The only other set element is a joggling board, a long springy plank set on two upright supports with rocker feet. Graham had discovered the rocking chair-bench hybrid when the Martha Graham Dance Company appeared at Spoleto USA in Charleston.

The musician enters first and sits at the piano, repeatedly striking a foreboding chord. The dancers come in, initially a couple executing an overhead lift, then a circle of dancers, leaping and landing dramatically to the pounding of the piano. A female ensemble member breaks away from the group to perform a bouncing dance on the joggling board. The audience then hears Graham's recorded voice, "Oh Louis, play me the Maple Leaf Rag!"

As Joplin's music starts, the stage lights come up. Six couples dance joyfully around the board on which the lone female now reclines. The pianist briefly interrupts the rag to reprise the ominous beat as a somber white-gowned, chignoned figure crosses the stage in a series of swirling turns. As she exits, the ensemble returns to joyous movement.

The ballet is approximately 15 minutes in length. Three Scott Joplin rags provide the work's structure: Maple Leaf Rag (1899) opens the dance, followed by the waltz Bethena (1905) and Elite Syncopations (1902); a reprise of Maple Leaf Rag concludes the dance.

The work is brimming with parodies of Graham's signature moves and send-ups of her best-known dances. Her twirling white-clad surrogate crosses the stage intermittently, accompanied each time by ill-boding percussive piano. Graham also pokes fun at the overwrought sexuality of some her repertory. Just before darkness hides the remaining couple on stage, he tears off her skirt.

== Critical reception ==
Maple Leaf Rag was Graham's 180th choreographic work. Even so, reviewers noted, she still had the capacity to surprise and delight. "The new piece is an entertaining poke by a genius at her own cliches, tersely and wittily stated," wrote The New York Times' Anna Kisselgoff.

A critic seeing a much later performance said, "While she worked out her obsessions onstage, Graham also had a keen but oft-overlooked sense of humor. Set to several Scott Joplin rags that were still in vogue during her teenage years, Maple Leaf Rag is a sly and playful dance that effectively employs Graham's expressive vocabulary while winking at her own cliches."

Those most familiar with the troupe's repertory better understood the inside jokes. A takeoff on the "dart" step from Errand into the Maze was recognized by one reviewer. Another noticed Night Journey's "hiccupping" Furies. The dance critic for San Francisco Classical Voice identified "the dancers' foot-to-foot from Acrobats of God, the grabs and grimaces from Clytemnestra, the ecstatic clapping of the acolytes in Appalachian Spring, and...the exalted kick turns from the white-clad Graham solo Letter to the World, ending in a sobering yet giggle-worthy frozen pose."

== Performance history ==
An audience favorite since the first performance, Maple Leaf Rag is a staple of the Graham company repertoire. It is also included in Three Dances by Martha Graham, a TV program produced by WNET for PBS. Terese Capucilli appears as the Graham surrogate. Kathleen Turner provides the narration.
