= Wake Forest Dance Festival =

Annual dance festival in North Carolina

The Wake Forest Dance Festival is an annual public arts festival in Wake Forest, North Carolina. The festival is presented by ARTS Wake Forest and the Wege Foundation in partnership with the Wake Forest Department of Parks, Recreation and Cultural Resources.

The festival is a one-day event held in Autumn every year at E. Carroll Joyner Park in Wake Forest. It is free to the public. The festival features national and international professional dancers, local choreographers and dancers, and students of local dance schools. The festival is directed by Masha Dashkina Maddux, a former principal dancer with the Martha Graham Dance Company, and was founded in 2017. The festival has featured performances by the UNCG School of Dance, Carolina Ballet, Gaspard & Dancers, and the Paul Taylor Dance Company.

The festival awards scholarships to dance students who are performing.
