= Stephanie Klemons =

American dancer and choreographer

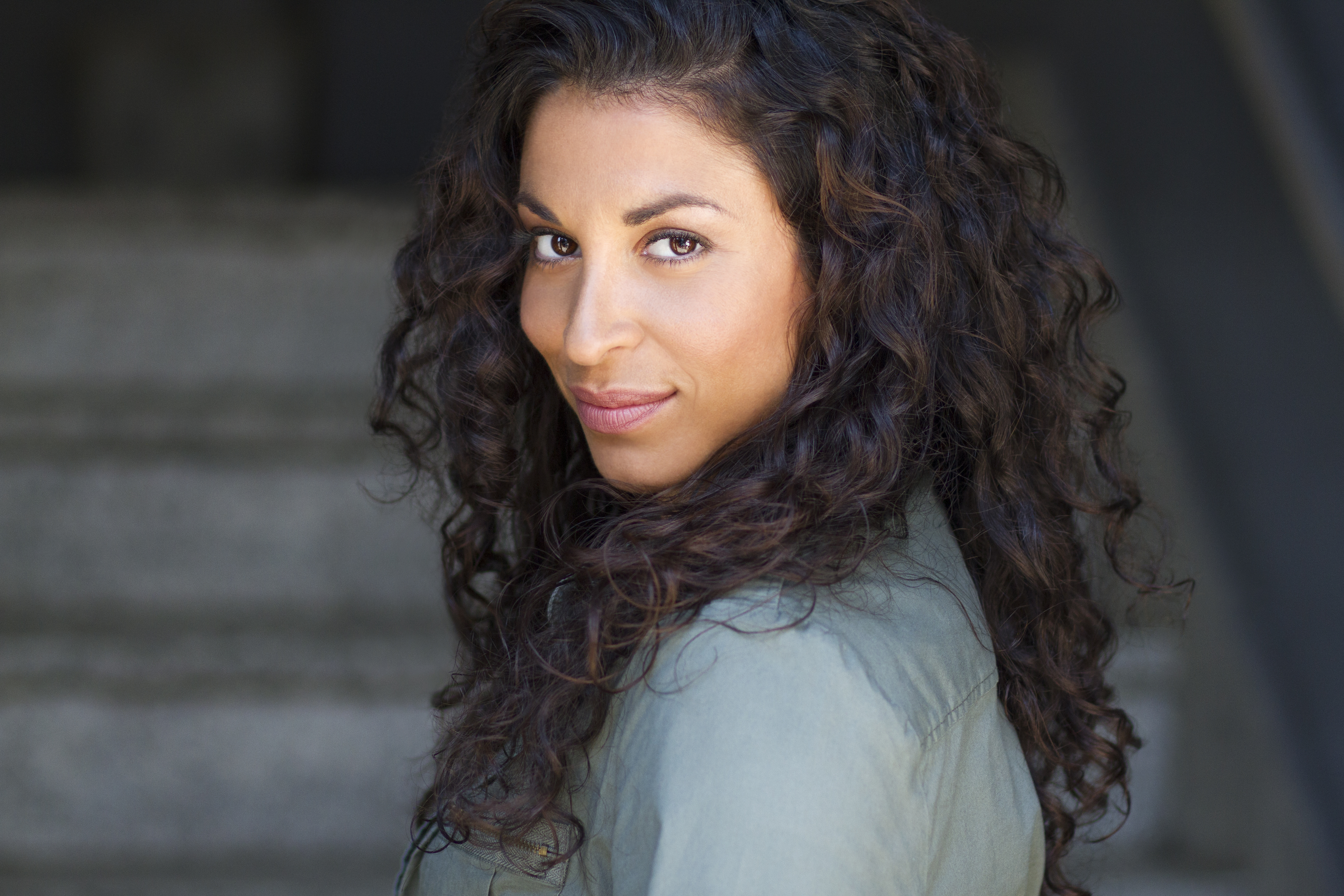
- Born: Stephanie Crain Klemons; September 27, 1982 (age 43); Manhattan, New York, U.S.
- Education: Rutgers University
- Occupations: Performer; choreographer
- Years active: 2004–present
- Spouse: Colleen Quinn

Stephanie Klemons (born September 27, 1982) is an American Broadway performer and choreographer. She is best known for her work as the Associate Choreographer and original Dance Captain of the musical Hamilton, as well as her roles in the original Broadway casts of In the Heights and If/Then.

== Early life and education ==
Klemons was born in Manhattan and raised in Colts Neck Township, New Jersey, graduating from Marlboro High School in 2000. She attended Rutgers University on a scholarship, completing a double major in genetics and microbiology research alongside modern dance.

While an undergraduate, she co-authored a study on macrophage differentiation in human myeloid leukemia cells, which was published in the International Journal of Oncology. After graduating in 2004, Klemons lived in Spain for several months teaching English.

== Career ==
Klemons trained at the Gallery of Dance and the Colts Neck Dance & Performing Arts Academy. She later pursued professional training at the Broadway Dance Center and Studio Maestro in Manhattan.

Her career has seen frequent collaboration with director Thomas Kail and choreographer Andy Blankenbuehler. She was a member of the original Broadway company of In the Heights, serving as an ensemble performer and Dance Captain. She later joined the original Broadway cast of If/Then and was the Associate Choreographer and original Dance Captain for the Broadway and Chicago productions of Hamilton.

=== Theatre credits ===
Year	Title	Role	Venue	Notes
2008	In the Heights	Ensemble / Dance Captain	Richard Rodgers Theatre	Original Broadway Cast
2012	Bring It On	Associate Choreographer	St. James Theatre	Broadway
2014	If/Then	Anne / Dance Captain	Richard Rodgers Theatre	Original Broadway Cast
2015	Hamilton	Ensemble / Associate Choreographer	Richard Rodgers Theatre	Original Broadway Cast
2022	Rock & Roll Man	Choreographer	New World Stages	Off-Broadway

== Awards and nominations ==
Year	Award	Category	Work	Result	Ref
2007	Drama Desk Award	Outstanding Ensemble Performance	In the Heights	Won	
2008	Actors' Equity Association	ACCA Award for Outstanding Broadway Chorus	In the Heights	Won	
2013	Carbonell Award	Best Choreography	In the Heights (Actors' Playhouse)	Nominated	
2016	Grammy Award	Best Musical Theater Album	Hamilton	Won	
