= Matt Turney =

- Matt Turney as the Pioneer Woman in "Appalachian Spring." Photo by Martha Swope
- Born: 1925; Americus, Georgia
- Died: December 20, 2009 (aged 83–84); Poughkeepsie, New York
- Education: University of Wisconsin
- Occupation: Dancer
- Spouse: Bob Teague

Matt Turney (1925–2009) was a principal dancer with the Martha Graham Dance Company and was with the company for over two decades.

== Biography ==
Matt Turney was born in 1925 in Americus, Georgia. Turney studied dance with Nancy Hauser and received her B.A. in dance from the University of Wisconsin at Madison. After graduation, she moved to New York City with her friend Mary Hinkson, who joined the Martha Graham School. Soon after, Turney joined the company as one of the company’s first black dancers. Turney was known for her ability to remain perfectly still during performances. Her statuesque eloquence made her a standout member of Graham’s company, and is best evidenced in her role as the Pioneer Woman in the ballet Appalachian Spring.

She was part of the Martha Graham Dance Company from 1951 to 1972. She worked with other choreographers including Alvin Ailey, Donald McKayle, Pearl Primus, and Paul Taylor.

Turney was married for a time to the television reporter Bob Teague with whom she had one child. The couple divorced.

Turney died on December 20, 2009, in Poughkeepsie, New York.
