= Eugene Louis Faccuito =

American dancer (1925–2015)

- Born: Eugene Louis Faccuito; March 20, 1925; Steubenville, Ohio, U.S.
- Died: April 7, 2015 (aged 90); New York City, New York
- Occupation(s): Dancer, choreographer, teacher

Eugene Louis Faccuito (March 20, 1925 – April 7, 2015), known professionally as Luigi, was an American jazz dancer, choreographer, teacher, and innovator who created the jazz exercise technique. The Luigi Warm Up Technique is a training program that promotes body alignment, balance, core strength, and "feeling from the inside". It is also used for rehabilitation. This method became the world's first standard technique for teaching jazz and musical theater dance.

Faccuito developed the technique, which consists of a series of ballet-based exercises, for his rehabilitation after suffering paralyzing injuries in a car accident at the age of 21. He couldn't stop dancing, so he first learned to regain control of his body by what he uses as a cornerstone of his technique – namely, to "lengthen and stretch the body without strain" and "put the good side into the bad side". He then focused on a way "to stabilize himself – as if he were pressing down on an invisible (dance) barre". He went on to have a successful dance career and became a world-renowned jazz teacher.

== Early life and career ==
Born in Steubenville, Ohio, Luigi is the eighth of eleven children of immigrant Italian parents, Nicola and Antoinette (Savoia) Faccuito. His father died when Luigi was five. His older brother Tony taught him to sing, dance, and use contortionist skills so he could enter local talent contests to win prize money for the family. He was a natural performer who won many events. At the age of 10, he had an agent who got him a job with bandleader Ted Lewis as the shadow in Lewis's "Me and My Shadow". He won The Original Amateur Hour contest in nearby Pittsburgh.

At thirteen, Luigi replaced Dean Martin, his neighbor, in the Bernie Davis Orchestra, a local twelve-man band that performed at weddings, school dances, and special events throughout Pennsylvania, Ohio, and West Virginia. He stayed with the band for close to five years.

Aged 18, he was drafted into the U.S. Navy during World War II. He served in the Pacific Theater – New Guinea and the Philippines - until the war's end. After returning home at age 21, he enrolled in college to become a lawyer, but his brother Tony pushed him to study in Hollywood under the G. I. Bill of Rights to pursue a film career.

He moved to California, enrolled in his first ballet classes with Bronislava Nijinska, and studied other theatrical forms at Falcon Studios in Hollywood. Three months later, in 1946, he was in a car accident that left him paralyzed on the right side of his body. After awakening months later from a coma, he was told by doctors that he would never walk again.

== Technique and Hollywood career ==
Conventional therapy at that time did not help Luigi much. To regain control of his body, he started to experiment and design his own stretches. After nine months of self therapy, he returned to Falcon Studios where he trained daily. In 1948, he was hired by Horace Heidt, a popular pianist and big band leader, to choreograph for his Bandwagon tour. A few months later, back in Los Angeles, the three became housemates. It was then that Luigi, with Frontiere's help, coined "5, 6, 7, 8" as a lead-in for when to start dancing. He started to use the phrase around other dancers.

In 1949, a talent scout discovered Luigi in a benefit show and brought him to Metro-Goldwyn-Mayer Studios to audition for On the Town. Gene Kelly was impressed by Luigi's dancing and gave him the job despite his facial paralysis and crossed eyes. This job led to a long friendship, during which Kelly became Luigi's mentor and used him in his other films, such as Singin' in the Rain. He warmed up using his own stretches and strengthening exercises and soon found other performers following him. "Alton encouraged (Luigi) to take up teaching his evolving style", so he began a late afternoon class at Rainbow Studios in 1951.

Between films, Luigi also performed in professional musicals at the Greek Theatre and with the Moro Landis Dancers, mostly at the Sahara Hotel in Las Vegas. While Luigi was working with Nita Bieber in an East Indian dance act promoted by MGM, Bieber's agent offered to represent him if he formed his own act, which he did, the Gene Louis Dancers.

== New York City and career ==
In 1956, choreographer Alex Romero brought Luigi to New York City to perform on Broadway with Ethel Merman and Fernando Lamas in Happy Hunting. The show brought Luigi to the attention of east coast dancers, and choreographer June Taylor, who invited him to teach at her school. A few months later, to better suit his schedule, he began teaching his own classes. In 1961, Luigi was one of the first teachers hired for Dance Caravan, a yearly summer dance convention troupe. This job brought his teachings and his new technique book - with his philosophy and recorded music for class - to dancers in major cities across America. He remained with the organization and became one of the long-standing teachers until its closing in 2009. In addition to his classes in New York City, dance conventions helped turn Luigi's work into the foundation for jazz dance classes in academic institutions and studios across the United States. He found himself in demand for a wide range of projects, including teaching, choreographing, staging, and touring. He accepted an invitation from Germany to teach at an international workshop which boosted his reputation across Europe. He was invited to work in many more European countries including, England, Italy and France; began teaching master classes at the Radio City Music Hall for the performers; and joined the faculty of the Harkness Ballet School.

== Highlights ==
- In 1967, Luigi choreographed a short film, Exorcism, which won the Cine-Golden Eagle Award in the United States and the Irish Film Festival Award.
- In 1972, Luigi taught in Cape Town, South Africa, where he was the first dance teacher to allow both whites and blacks to participate together in classes and then, during a public lecture at the Nico Malan Opera House, to perform together onstage to demonstrate his work.
- In 1974, he formed Luigi's Jazz Dance Company, which toured internationally for two years. The company folded because he could not get government funding. His pieces from that era are performed in venues around the world.
- After returning from teaching in Tokyo, Japan, in 1978, Luigi started to teach a second method that he devised with Michio Ito. This work concentrates on a set of arm positions which go beyond ballet's basic five arm positions. These twenty four additional arm placements give jazz dance more patterns, with a unified appearance. He named these arms positions Lurythmics.
- In 1981, Gene Kelly asked Luigi to assist him on a Broadway show that he was to direct and choreograph. The show, called Satchmo, was based on the life of Louis Armstrong but never went into production because of financial difficulties.
- In 1982, Donald Saddler brought Valentina Kozlova to Luigi to be coached for her Broadway debut in the revival of On Your Toes. The show featured George Balanchine's Slaughter on Tenth Avenue, which Luigi worked with Koslova on.
- In 1982, Luigi's technique book was translated into Japanese. Also, the biggest Japanese dance supply company, Chacott, started to market Luigi-endorsed jazz shoes and a line of apparel called Luigi Brand Dancewear.
- In 1987, Luigi's warm up book was translated into Italian.
- In 1992, Luigi trained the Hungarian Sports and Rhythmic Gymnastics Team in Budapest, Hungary, for two weeks. Many of the team members went on to compete in the Olympics.

In addition to teaching at Dance Masters of America and Dance Educators of America's conventions, Luigi has served as guest faculty for the High School of Performing Arts, City University of New York, Sarah Lawrence College, Renato Greco's Stages in Rome and Amalfi, Italy, New York University, The Metropolitan Opera, Joffrey Ballet Summer School, Dennis Wayne's Dancers Workshop in Italy, Broadway Theater Project, Studio Maestro Summer Workshop, Jacob's Pillow, Youth Dance Festival and Dance Teacher Summit in New York City.

== 2000 and beyond ==
Throughout the 2000s, Luigi choreographed and staged numbers for many benefit events, including Michael Zaslow's benefits for A.L.S. (Lou Gehrig's disease) on Broadway, the Dance Library of Israel, the New York Jazz Choreography Project, Dancers Over 40 benefits for Broadway Cares/Equity Fights AIDS, the TranscenDance Group dance company, and the Ailey/Fordham Bachelor of Fine Arts Senior Solo Concert.

Luigi died on April 7, 2015, at the age of 90, in his Manhattan home.

== Awards and honors ==
Luigi has been commended for his life's work by three U.S. presidents – Reagan, Bush, and Clinton. He received the "Fred Astaire Award from the Theatre Development Fund, a proclamation for "Luigi Day in New York City" from Mayor Ed Koch, was the grand marshal of the Dance Parade on Broadway in 2008, and an Ohio governor awarded him the Man of the Year in his hometown.

In 2013 Luigi was honored by Antonio Fini with the Lifetime Achievement Award at the inaugural Italian International Dance Festival.

Luigi received the Lifetime Achievement Award in Dance at the 2013 Bessie Awards.

== Filmography ==
=== Features ===
- Yes Sir, That's My Baby (1947)
- On the Town (1948)
- Toast of New Orleans (1948)
- Jerry Gray and the Band of Today (1948)
- Let's Dance (1949)
- Annie Get Your Gun (1949)
- An American in Paris (1950)
- Singin' In The Rain (1950)
- Rainbow Round My Shoulder (1951)
- Five Thousand Fingers of Dr. T (1951)
- Call Me Madame (1952)
- The Band Wagon (1952)
- All Ashore (1953)
- Calamity Jane (1953)
- White Christmas (1955)
- Cha-Cha-Cha-Boom (1956)
- Invitation to the Dance (1956)
- Bela Lugosi Meets the Brooklyn Gorilla (1956)
- Ten Commandments (1956)
- Exorcism (1967)

=== Stage productions ===
- Anything Goes, 1948, performer, the Greek Theatre, Los Angeles, CA.
- New Moon, 1949, performer, the Greek Theatre, Los Angeles, CA.
- Girl Crazy, 1949, performer, the Greek Theatre, Los Angeles, CA.
- Annie Get Your Gun, 1951, performer, the Greek Theatre, Los Angeles, CA.
- Look, That's Life, 1952, assistant choreographer to Nick Castle, Las Palmas Theater, Los Angeles, CA.
- Happy Hunting, 1956, performer, Broadway, New York, NY
- Whoop-Up, 1958, assistant choreographer, performer, Broadway, New York, N.Y.
- The Happy Time, 1959, assistant choreographer, performer, Broadway, New York, NY
- Carousel, 1960, performer, choreographer, Equity Library Theater, New York, N.Y.
- Can-Can, 1960, choreographer, Charlotte Summer Theater, Charlotte, North Carolina
- Brigadoon, 1960, choreographer, performer, Charlotte Summer Theater, Charlotte, North Carolina
- Let it Ride, 1961, assistant choreographer, performer, Broadway, New York, N.Y.

== See also ==
- List of dancers
