= Deaths and Entrances (ballet) =

Ballet choreographed by Martha Graham

Deaths and Entrances is a ballet choreographed by Martha Graham performed to music by Hunter Johnson. Arch Lauterer created the original set; Edythe Gilfond designed the costumes. The ballet was well-received from the first performance despite being labeled as one of Graham's most personal, least accessible works. Oscar de la Renta created new costumes for the ballet's 2005 revival. The piece premiered on July 18, 1943, at Bennington College in Bennington, Vermont. The first performance was an informal preview for which the dancers wore practice clothes although the set was in place.

== Title, theme and structure ==
Deaths and Entrances is staged for ten dancers, six women and four men. The piece takes its title from the Dylan Thomas poem of the same name, a dark reflection on human suffering and grief. The story is inspired by the lives of the "doom-eager" Brontë sisters: Emily, Charlotte and Anne and the women's struggle for self-fulfillment within the era's limitations of convention and tradition. Some viewers also interpret the ballet as the tale of a love triangle, perhaps the one at the heart of Wuthering Heights, or one involving Emily or Graham.

The account of repressed passions takes place in the gloomy interior of an ancient house. Each sister has a set of signature movements specific to her character. Two rival suitors, The Dark Beloved and The Poetic Beloved, enter and leave the scene, stone-faced and inscrutable even as they fist fight. The male characters might also be seen as two sides of one man. The Three Remembered Children, younger versions of the Brontë sisters or perhaps characters representing Graham and her two sisters, skip in and out of the action. Scenes of a chess match, Graham's metaphor for existential life and death, are woven throughout the dance. Emily offers herself to The Dark Beloved, but rejects him when he tries to dominate her. In a violent, convulsive solo passage, she teeters on the brink of madness. In the end, she is able to compose herself and win, or perhaps destroy, the game. Props weighted with symbolism, a transparent goblet, a pair of phallus-like chess pieces and a large conch shell, are moved about the scene with "an air of mystic ritual."

== Original cast and reception ==
The original cast members were:

- Martha Graham as Emily Brontë
- Jane Dudley as Charlotte Brontë
- Sophie Maslow as Anne Brontë
- Erick Hawkins as The Dark Beloved
- Merce Cunningham as The Poetic Beloved
- The Three Remembered Children: Nina Fonaroff, Pearl Lang, Ethel Butler

Although it was well-received from its debut, Deaths and Entrances initially baffled both audiences and critics. The New York Times' John Martin, who had closely followed Graham's career wrote, "At first seeing, it is perfectly safe to say that not a single spectator can honestly report that he knows what the work is all about," but added "he must acknowledge that it is gripping and emotionally moving."

== Performance history ==
Deaths and Entrances is frequently performed by the Martha Graham Dance Company. It was reprised in 1970 with Mary Hinkson in the Graham role, in 1974 through 1977 with Phyllis Gutelius in the Central Role, in 1993 with Terese Capucilli and in 2005 and 2013 with Miki Orihara as the lead character.
