= Miriam Pandor =

German dancer, director, choreographer, teacher and writer

Miriam Pandor (October 29, 1924 in Hamburg – July 31, 2016 in Lübeck) was a German dancer, director, choreographer, teacher and writer. She is well-known for her works which address racism, antisemitism and social injustice.

== Early life, training and career ==
Pandor was born in Hamburg, Germany to writer and theater critic Oswald Pander and to dance teacher Susanne Pander. Her father died by force 1943 in Theresienstadt. In 1938, Pandor emigrated first to London, England, where she took her first dancing classes abroad with Marie Rambert. Later she and her mother emigrated to New York City, where her real dance career started. Miriam started to take lessons at George Balanchine' School of American Ballet (1941–1945).

== American career ==
In 1942, she turned towards modern dance and joined the Martha Graham Dance Company. Later she danced also as a soloist in companies of Doris Humphrey, José Limón (in "Song of Songs" (1947), "Sonata Opus 4" (1947)), Sophie Maslow, together with Charles Weidman, and was guest artist at the Alvin Ailey Dance Theater. She studied acting and directing with Jack Manning. During the 1940s, Pandor performed in Broadway shows and Off-Broadway shows and later in Hollywood movies (for instance Oklahoma! and Just for You, in which she danced together with Daniel Nagrin).

Among others, Pandor was a teacher at the Duncanbury School of Arts (Boston, Mass), 92nd Street Y (YMHA) and member of the New Dance Group Studio. At the YMHA, she was the first to teach a combined technique of Ballet and Modern Dance. Pandor also taught movement for singers and actors.

Throughout the 1950s, Pandor was politically active. In 1949, she traveled to Budapest in order to participate at the World Festival of Youth and Students. Back in the US she joined the Communist Party USA (CPUSA), participated in sit-ins and demonstrations. She choreographed the piece "Salem Witch Hunt" and founded her own Concert Company in New York, which performed at the Brooklyn Museum and Henry Street Playhouse. In 1968, Pandor spent nine months at the dancing school "Cuban Conjunto Nacional de Danza Moderna" in Cuba. New experiences and the collection of Cuban music helped her to form new expressive possibilities to incorporate in her New York Studio. Back in New York City she took up writing classes and started writing for the CPUSA's daily newspaper People's Daily World. She wrote poetry for cultural events of Westside Marxist Center, and taught Theater Workshops. In 1972, she was director of the Repertory Dancers, at the time New Jersey’s only professional modern dance company. Increasing health issues forced Pandor to rethink her professional perspective as a dance teacher and writing became an even stronger tool for her. She found, however, that in the mid-1970s interests of neither dance nor political journals in the USA were interdisciplinary enough for her work.

== European career ==
In 1976 she decided to move to the GDR, hoping she could contribute to the socialist society. She worked as a choreographer and English teacher and translator. After 1990 she also performed as an actress in independent progressive theater productions. During this time, she was eventually able to make valuable contributions to drama and pantomime students. Pandor continued writing and translating for progressive causes. Pandor was viewed highly as a dancer as reflected repetitively by the renown dance critic John Martin of the New York Times. Throughout most of her life she was a strong fighter not only for her ideas on dance, art and society, but also to combat her chronic pain and immobility. Miriam Pandor died July 31, 2016.

== Ideas about dance, art and society ==
Positive impulses at the World Festival of Youth and Students in Budapest, Hungary 1949 pertaining to the content of her choreography and dance presented an important step towards strengthening Pandor's goal to include socio-political comments in her art. She felt the necessity to fight against racism in the society, but also in art.

As a dance teacher Pandor tried to impart a realism in dance to her students. Dance should be based on the real body movements of the people, restoring the torn communication between the artists and the workers, the desired audience of her work. Art in its entirety can only be meaningful if it arises from understandable and authentic content, expressed by realistic forms of movement merged into modern dance. This is how Pandor's own system of socially conditioned dance motivation emerges. It also includes the appropriation of Afro-American jazz through dance.

== Selected works ==
- "Day on Earth" (1947), with José Limón, artistic direction of Doris Humphrey
- "Lynchtown", "Mostly About Women" Choreography by Charles Weidman
- "Faces From Walt Whitman" by James Dalglish (1950)
- "Salem Witch Hunt" (1952) Choreography by Miriam Pandor
- Broadway: Around the World (1946), "Sing Out, Sweet Land" (1944-1945), "Oklahoma! (1943-1948), "Finnian's Rainbow" (1956)
- Off-Broadway: "The Wolves" (1958), "The Shoemaker and the Peddler" (1959)
- Pictures: "Just For You" (1952)
- Television: The Magic Cottage (TV series) (1950), R.C.A. Victor Commercial (1951), "Volpone" (1960)
