= Bob Teague =

American journalist

- Born: January 2, 1929; Milwaukee, Wisconsin
- Died: March 28, 2013 (aged 84); New Brunswick, New Jersey
- Occupation: American television journalist
- Spouse: Matt Turney

Robert Lewis Teague (January 2, 1929 – March 28, 2013) was an African-American college football star and television news reporter.

Teague played college football at the University of Wisconsin–Madison. While a journalist with The New York Times, in May 1961, Teague (as Robert Teague) appeared as an impostor on the night-time version of TO TELL THE TRUTH, round 1. Airing May 22, 1961, Teague was able to fool the panel by getting two of the four votes while pretending to be Sergeant George Harris, an Air Force Judo instructor. Round 2 featured fellow journalist associated with the Times, Marianne Means, as the featured contestant along with two impostors.

He started at WNBC-TV in New York City in 1963 and became one of the city's first black television journalists and went on to work as a reporter, anchorman, and producer for more than three decades. He retired from WNBC-TV in 1991.

He wrote three books. "Letters to a Black Boy", Walker and Company, New York" A series of letters to his son Adam prefaced with a warning.", "Live and Off-Color: News Biz (1982, A&W Publishers) is an autobiography. "The Flip Side of Soul: Letters to My Son" (1989, William Morrow & Co.) is a series of reflections.
