= Salem Shore =

Dance choreograph by Martha Graham

Salem Shore is a solo modern dance work choreographed by Martha Graham to original music by Paul Nordoff. The piece premiered on December 26, 1943 at the 46th Street Theater in New York City. The ballet featured costumes by Edythe Gilfond and a set by Arch Lauterer. Program notes accompanying the first performance described the dance as "a ballad of a woman's longing for her beloved's return from the sea."

== Theme, structure and critical reception ==
The dance takes place on a minimal set evoking the New England shoreline. At center stage, sits a large twisted wreath of driftwood. Off to one side a small railing juts out, an abstraction of the widows' walks that punctuate the roof lines of the region's coastal homes. Another stylized architectural fragment approximates the outlines of a ship.

Clad in a plain dark dress, the soloist jumps in and out of the driftwood hoop, lifting her skirt and the letting it fall with a nervous plucking motion. Intermittently, she crosses to the railing, leaning forward as if to scan the watery horizon, and then returns to her previous activity. These movements are contrasted with her lunging reclines near the set element resembling a ship.

The music, composed for a small orchestra: piano, woodwinds, horn and double bass, enhances the ballet's intimacy. The dance is further illuminated by an off-stage voice reciting Elinor Wylie verses that refer to wedding vows. In the original performance, Graham danced the role of the sea wife; Graham's sister, Georgia Sargeant, performed the spoken word segments.

The New York Times critic John Martin described the dance as a "tender and poignant soliloquy" and Graham's acting skills "beautifully persuasive." The solo's meaning has been interpreted variously by different viewers. The New York Herald Tribune's Edwin Denby saw the dance of a reticent young woman "who remembers playing on the shore as a child, but knows now she is an adult." Others thought the movements represented jumps back and forth between happy memories of married life and "the present urgency of waiting." Stuart Hodes, who had sometimes performed the role of off-stage narrator, described the solo years later, "A woman's lover goes to sea and does not return. Mad with grief she lives in the dream he will return, and each day goes to the shore in her finest dress to be beautiful when he appears. Is it weeks, months, years?"

=== 1992 revival ===
Before her death, Graham selected ten of her older pieces for potential revival. Salem Shore, which had last been staged in 1947, was among these. Following her death, Terese Capucilli, Martha Graham Dance Company Principal, and Carol Fried, the troupe's rehearsal director, began collecting information: drawings, old photographs and written material, including notations made on Nordoff's score, in order to recreate the piece. The new version premiered in 1992.

As part of the revised work, the pair created a larger on-stage role for the once-hidden speaker. On opening night, the actress Claire Bloom performed the part, which included motions in sympathy with the soloist as a kind of alter ego. The revival also included a new two-part set created by sculptor Stephan Weiss. The curved brass pieces were designed to evoke a ship's mast and prow.

As Graham had requested, the reconstructed Salem Shore was dedicated to her friend and benefactress Alice Tully.
