= PeiJu Chien-Pott =

Taiwanese dancer

- Born: 1984 (age 41–42); Taoyuan, Taiwan
- Occupations: Choreographer, director, dancer, educator, and founder
- Website: https://www.peiju.org

PeiJu Chien-Pott (Chinese: 簡珮如; pinyin: Jiǎn Pèirú; Wade–Giles: Chien^{3} P'ei^{4}-ju^{2}; also known as PeiJu Chien Dubilier following her marriage in 2026, born 1984) is a Taiwanese interdisciplinary artist. She was a principal dancer for the Martha Graham Dance Company.

Born in 1984, she was raised in Taoyuan. Chien-Pott started dancing at the age of five, and began training aged 10. She later entered Taipei National University of the Arts' seven-year dance program developed by Lo Man-fei. Chien-Pott continued to study dance under Merce Cunningham, and later performed with Buglisi Dance Theatre and Korhan Basaran and Artists, and Nimbus Dance Works. She joined the Martha Graham Dance Company in 2011, after her second audition, and became a principal dancer in 2014 before leaving the troupe in 2016.

Chien-Pott is described as "the most dramatically daring and physically chameleon-esque" dancer who is able to "communicates the emotional message of the Graham works with such beautiful clarity." She founded PEIJU Performing Arts in Taiwan. In 2017, Chien-Pott was invited to perform at the Taipei Universiade. Later that year, she received the Bessie Award for best performance in Martha Graham's Ekstasis. Chien-Pott was starring in the Sia, Akram Khan, Zhang Jun, Jonathan Aibel and Glenn Berger-helmed kung-fu musical "Dragon Spring Phoenix Rise" at The Shed.

== Personal life ==
She has a daughter from her first marriage. She remarried in 2026 and resides in Connecticut.

== Awards and achievements ==
- 2014- Honored with “POSITANO PREMIA LA DANZA "LEONIDE MASSINE" for "Most Outstanding Female Dancer on the Contemporary Scene".
- 2017- Bessie Award for "Outstanding Performer" in Dance for her performances of Virginie Mécène’s reimagining of Martha Graham’s 1933 lost solo Ekstasis.
- 2017- “Outstanding Alumni Award” from Taipei National University of the Arts
- 2017- "Outstanding Citizen" from the government of Taiwan
- 2018- Capri International Dance Award
- 2018 and 2019- “Outstanding Elite” in Performing Arts by the Generation T List of Asia Tatler
- 2019- “Ten Outstanding Young Persons of Taiwan” by Junior Chamber International
- 2021- One of the “Best Dance of 2021” by New York Times for her solo performance in Richard Move’s production “Herstory of the Universe” premiered at the Governors Island in New York City on October 9, 2021
- 2023- Awarded a choreography fellowship from New Jersey Council on the Arts
- 2024- Named “Asia’s Most Influential TW” from the Tatler Asia.
- 2025- Awarded an “Extraordinary Dancer Award” from FINI Dance Award Italy.
