= Jacqulyn Buglisi =

American choreographer

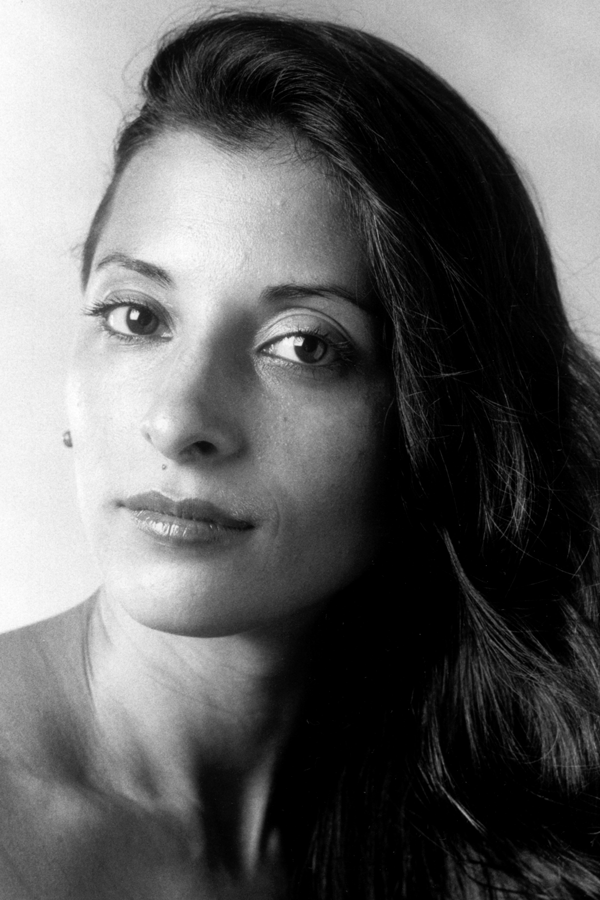
- Born: February 19, 1951 (age 75); New York City, New York, United States
- Occupations: Choreographer, artistic director, dancer, educator
- Awards: 2020 Bessie Award
- Website: Buglisi Dance Theatre Table of Silence

Jacqulyn Buglisi is an American choreographer, artistic director, dancer, and educator. In 1993, she co-founded the Buglisi Dance Theatre with Terese Capucilli, Christine Dakin, and Donlin Foreman.

== Career ==
=== As a choreographer ===
Buglisi primarily choreographs contemporary works and has created a repertoire of nearly 100 dances.

Internationally her work has been featured at the Melbourne International Festival (State Theatre), International Dance Week in Prague, Sadler's Wells Theatre in London, Rovereto Festival in Italy, and other venues across the Czech Republic, Japan, France, and Israel.

In a 2001 review for Dance Magazine, dance critic Lynn Garafola wrote, "Buglisi is a rarity in today's world, a woman who delights in the many splendid forms of female being. Probably no woman, other than Graham, has plumbed such emotional depths choreographically."

In his review of Buglisi’s Under the Buttonwood Tree, which Buglisi had choreographed for Lower Manhattan Cultural Council, Alastair Macaulay of The New York Times remarked, "Cecil B. DeMille would have been proud."

Buglisi has collaborated with Venezuelan painter and filmmaker Jacobo Borges on works including Rain (music by Glen Velez), Sand (music by Philip Glass), and Blue Cathedral (music by Jennifer Higdon). She has also worked with composer Jack Mehler.

She choreographed Moss Anthology: Variation #5, which was performed at vildwerk.'s inaugural program, Time to Protect Our Planet in 2024. Though Moss Anthology: Variation #5 had previously been performed as a work in progress, CriticalDance.org reported the performance was complete at the Time to Protect Our Planet event. vildwerk. is a nonprofit organization inspiring conservation awareness through dance. In June 2026, a variation of the ballet, Moss Anthology: Variation #5b, was performed by artists of Buglisi Dance Theatre at Bryant Park’s Summer Stage at vildwerk.'s Dancing For The Wild event.

She created the ballet The Wing And The Shell for the Dancing For The Wild for vildwerk., which will be performed at the organization's New York City Center event on January 21, 2027. Buglisi joined vilderwerk. as an advisory founding board member in 2022.

==== Table of Silence Project 9/11 ====
Buglisi conceived and choreographed the Table of Silence Project 9/11, a large-scale public tribute and ritual performance presented annually on September 11 at Lincoln Center since 2011. Buglisi acknowledges her artistic collaborators Associate Artistic Director Terese Capucilli, visual artist Rossella Vasta, composer/percussionist Paula Jeanine Bennett, composer/violinist Daniel Bernard Roumain. The free performance is a ritual and call to action for peace. Lincoln Center live-streamed the tribute via YouTube by Nel Shelby Productions.

Site-specific performances of Table of Silence have been staged at multiple venues, including Syracuse University's Pan Am 103 Remembrance Wall during the company's NYSCA residency, in Perugia and Assisi (Italy), and at the University of California, Santa Barbara, as a tribute to the victims of the May 23, 2014, Isla Vista shooting.

Buglisi’s company repertoire is archived at the Jerome Robbins Dance Division of the New York Public Library for the Performing Arts.

=== As a Dancer ===
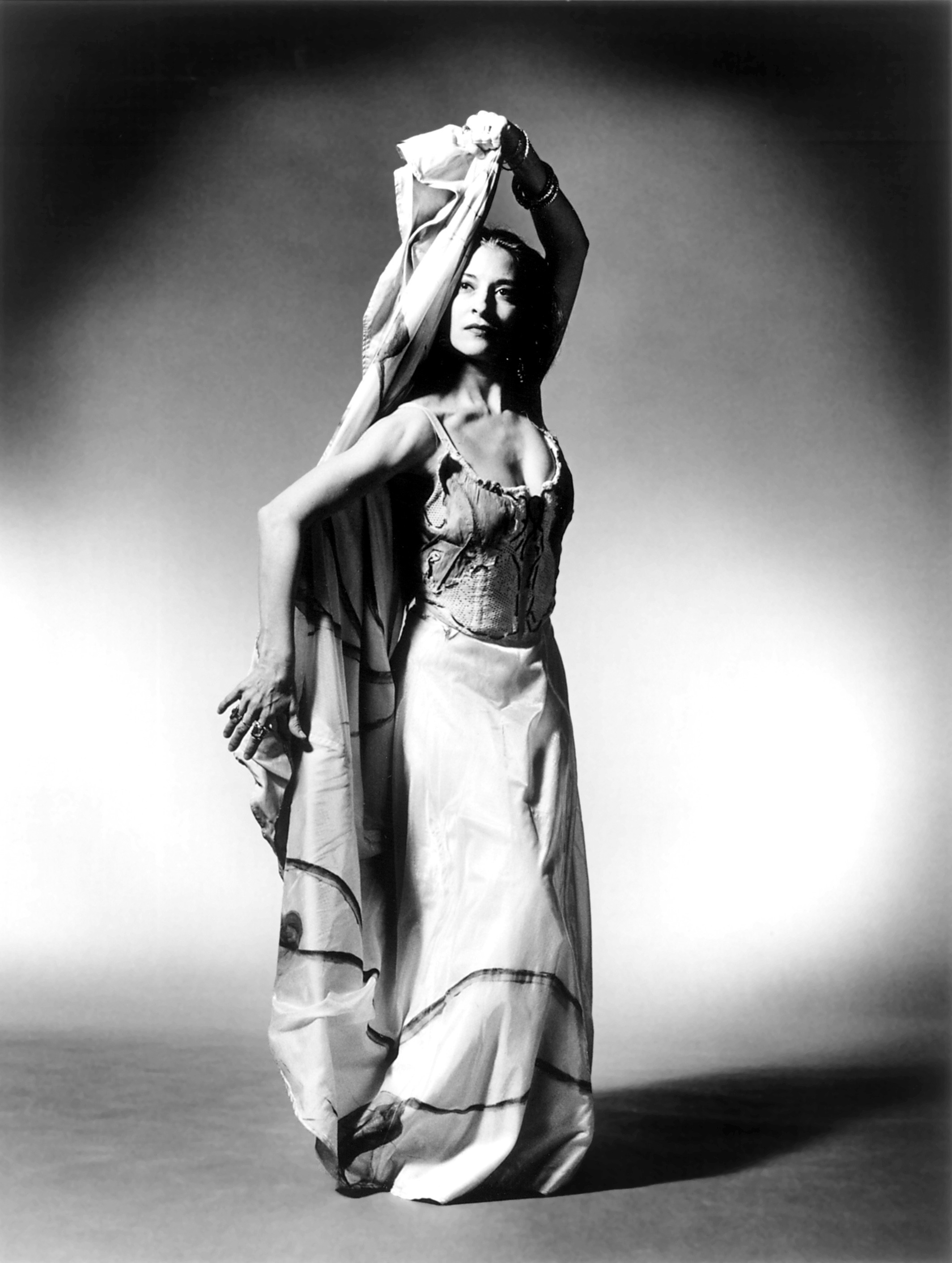
Jacqulyn Buglisi in performance Photo by Jack Mitchell

Buglisi was a Principal Dancer with the Martha Graham Dance Company, touring the world. She performed in tribute to Graham during the CBS-televised Kennedy Center Honors, and was featured in the PBS special An Evening of Dance and Conversation with Martha Graham.

Coached by Jane Sherman, she performed solos by Ruth St. Denis at venues including Jacob's Pillow and the Lyon Biennale de la Danse. She appeared in the documentaries Trailblazers of American Modern Dance and The Spirit of Denishawn, each of which highlight early 20th-century pioneers of American modern dance.

=== As an Educator ===
Buglisi is Chair of the Graham technique Department for the Ailey/Fordham BFA program, and has served on the faculties of The Juilliard School and the Martha Graham School.

Buglisi has been commissioned by the Juilliard School's Emerging Modern Master's Series, Ailey/Fordham University B.F.A. Program, the University of Richmond, California State University, Long Beach, George Mason University, Purchase Conservatory of Dance, Interlochen Center for the Arts, the State Ballet College of Oslo, Oklahoma Arts Institute, Jacob's Pillow Dance Festival, Boston Conservatory of Music, Randolph-Macon College, and National Dance Institute, among others.

In 1970, Buglisi founded the first school of contemporary dance for the community of Spoleto, Italy, and was the Master Artist-in-Residence at Kaatsbaan Cultural Park and at the Atlantic Center for the Arts. She taught for the Dance Aspen Festival from 1990 to 1995, the Julio Bocca Center in Argentina, the Victoria College in Melbourne in 1999, and the Chautauqua Institution and Festival from 1995 to 2005.

She was named honorary chair for the Marymount Manhattan College 2005 Gala and served as a panelist for both the Heinz Family Foundation and the New Jersey State Council on the Arts. Buglisi holds creative and educational residencies at Kaatsbaan International Dance Center, Munson-Williams-Proctor Arts-Institute, SUNY Purchase, California State University, Long Beach, George Mason University, University of Richmond, The Mahayfee Theater Class Act in FSU at Tallahassee, Petersburg, Florida, and Syracuse University.

Buglisi was on the Dance/USA's Board of Trustees as Chair of the Artistic Directors' Council from 2010 to 2013.

== Recognition ==
Buglisi's awards and honors include the 2022 Juilliard President's Medal presented by President Damian Woetzel citing Buglisi's leadership as a "citizen artist", the 2024 Martha Hill Award, American Dance Guild Award for Artistic Excellence, the 2016 Italian International Lifetime Achievement Award, the Fiorello LaGuardia Award for Excellence in the field of Dance, the 2014 Kaatsbaan International Playing Field Award, the Gertrude Shurr Award for Dance, and Altria Group's 2007 Women Choreographer Initiative Award. Buglisi has received grants for new work from the National Endowment for the Arts, New York State Council on the Arts, NYC Department of Cultural Affairs, Harkness Foundation for Dance, Howard Gilman Foundation, and The O'Donnell-Green Music & Dance Foundation.

Buglisi received the 2020 Bessie’s Awards Special Citation for Table of Silence Project 9/11.

== See also ==
- List of choreographers
- List of people from New York City
