= Kazuko Hirabayashi =

Dance teacher and choreographer

Kazuko Hirabayashi (October 18, 1933 – March 25, 2016) was a dance teacher and choreographer. She was born in Japan, where she completed her college education before going to New York to enroll in the Juilliard school.

== Early life and education ==
Hirabayashi was born in Nagoya, Japan on October 18, 1933. She received a college bachelor of science degree before leaving Japan for the United States. At the Juilliard School she studied with Martha Graham, José Limón, and Antony Tudor.

== Dance and teaching career ==
Hirabayashi formed her own dance troupe in 1965 with Richard Kuch and Richard Gain, both dancers in the Martha Graham technique. In 1967, she founded her own Kazuko Hirabayashi Dance Theater. She also was for a time director of the Graham school and director of the junior troupe of the Martha Graham Ensemble.

She had a long legacy as a teacher. She began teaching at Juilliard in 1968, and then was hired as a founding faculty member of the Dance Division at SUNY Purchase in 1972. Among her students were Ohad Naharin, director of the Batsheva Dance Company in Israel, and Robert Swinston, of the Merce Cunningham company.

Many of her choreographed works were premiered at SUNY Purchase and Juilliard. Her works, and those of other choreographers, were performed by her troupe.

== Death ==
In 2012, she learned that she had amyotrophic lateral sclerosis. She died at age 82 in 2016.
