= Carolyn Adams (dancer) =

American dancer, educator (b. 1943)

- Born: August 16, 1943 (age 82); New York City, New York, United States
- Education: Sarah Lawrence College (BA), Martha Graham School of Contemporary Dance, Fordham University (MSW), Sorbonne University
- Occupations: Dancer, choreographer, teacher
- Spouse: Robert Kahn

Carolyn Adams (born August 16, 1943) is an American dancer, choreographer, and teacher. In 1965, she joined the Paul Taylor Dance Company (PTDC), being the first and only African-American member at the time, and she remained a dancer there until 1982. She is faculty at the Juilliard School in New York City since 1983.

== Biography ==
Adams was born on August 16, 1943, in New York City, and raised in Harlem. Her parents were Olive Arnold Adams, a writer and composer; and Julius J. Adams, a newspaper editor. Her sister Julie Adams Strandberg also became a noted dancer in New York City. She attended the Ethical Culture Fieldston School, and studied dance at the Martha Graham School of Contemporary Dance (now Martha Graham Center of Contemporary Dance), with Martha Graham.

Adams graduated with a B.A. degree in 1965 from Sarah Lawrence College in Yonkers, New York; and a M.S.W. degree in 2006 from Fordham University in New York City. She also attended the Sorbonne University in Paris.

In 1965 joined the Paul Taylor Dance Company (PTDC), while attending her final year at Sarah Lawrence College. At her time of hire at PTDC, she was the first and only African-American dancer. Adams married Robert Kahn, another dancer at the Paul Taylor Dance Company.

Adams gained recognition as a dancer, and taught choreography workshops in London and Denmark. In 1973, while continuing her career as a dancer, she founded the Harlem Dance Studio and Foundation with her sister Julie Adams Strandberg. She is a faculty member at the Juilliard School in New York City since 1983. In May 2024, Adams was conferred an honorary doctorate degree from Juilliard School. Adams is a curator at the American Dance Legacy Institute at Brown University, an organization founded by her sister. She has also served as a panelist on the New York State Council on the Arts, and the National Endowment for the Arts.
