= Ron Protas =

American arts administrator (1941–2025)

- Born: Ronald Allen Protas; September 2, 1941; New York City, U.S.
- Died: October 15, 2025 (aged 84); New York City, U.S.
- Education: New York University
- Occupations: Administrator; artistic director
- Known for: Association with Martha Graham

Ronald Allen Protas (September 2, 1941 – October 15, 2025) was an associate director of the Martha Graham Center of Contemporary Dance and heir of modern dance choreographer Martha Graham, his friend of twenty-odd years. In her will, she left him the rights to her dances. Though not a dancer, he took over the Martha Graham Dance Company until its board dismissed him, leading to an extended legal battle over the ownership of Graham's work which was eventually resolved in the company's favor.

== Background ==
Ronald Allen Protas was born in Manhattan, New York, on September 2, 1941, and was brought up in Brooklyn, where he was educated Erasmus Hall High School. He subsequently attended New York University.

Agnes de Mille writes in Martha: The Life and Work of Martha Graham that in the late 1960s Protas, who had been a law student at Columbia University, became introduced to the Martha Graham Dance Company. De Mille writes that Protas was not well liked by company members, as he was not a dancer and had no reason to be involved with the company. Initially, Graham did not like Protas. But when Graham's health began to fail, as a result of her alcoholism and depression over having to retire from her performing career, Protas stepped in and nursed Graham back to health. De Mille writes that over the next several years the influence of Protas grew, eventually he and Graham restructured the company entirely. According to de Mille, Protas soon embarked on a campaign to copyright the Martha Graham Dance Technique: "Now, under the guidance of Ron Protas, there was an attempt to charge royalties for all usage, not only of composed dances, but of actual technique: an impossible objective." Eventually, Protas became the second most powerful person in the Martha Graham Center of Contemporary Dance, second only to the founder herself.

== Legal battle ==
In her autobiography Blood Memory Martha Graham writes that she trained Protas in her dance technique and named him as heir upon her death, intending to will him the rights to all of her dances. Protas was never trusted by many within Graham's company. Protas became artistic director of the Martha Graham Dance Company before being dismissed in 2000. In return, he sued the company, seeking to block them from performing Martha Graham's choreography. Only after a lengthy and multimillion-dollar legal battle were the rights to all but two of the choreographic works restored the Martha Graham Dance Company, with Judge Miriam Goldman Cedarbaum ruling that Graham never retained the rights to most of her dances to begin with.

== Later life and death ==
After losing in court, Protas struggled financially and sold many of the valuables that Graham had also bequeathed him. The Graham Center later made overtures to license the two of Graham's works that Protas retained the rights to, but he refused. He died from heart disease at his residence in Manhattan on October 15, 2025, at the age of 84.

== See also ==
- Martha Graham Center of Contemporary Dance
