= Studio Maestro =

Ballet school in New York City, USA

Manhattan Youth Ballet
- New York City; United States

Information
- Type: Ballet school
- Established: 1995; 31 years ago
- Founder: Rose Caiola
- Campus type: Urban
- Website: www.manhattanyouthballet.org

Studio Maestro is a pre-professional ballet school in New York City founded in 1995 by Rose Caiola. The school was renamed Manhattan Youth Ballet in 2005. A portion of its students have graduated into ballet companies including American Ballet Theatre, New York City Ballet, Washington Ballet, National Ballet of Croatia, Pennsylvania Ballet, National Ballet of Canada, San Francisco Ballet, and Ballet Nacional de España.

The school program is taught in eight levels, each of which has a specific set of skills that the student must master in order to advance to the next level. The school also has a four-week summer program held in August of every year.

The school's facility at the Manhattan Movement and Arts Center at West 60th Street, New York, opened with a ribbon-cutting evening on June 26, 2008.

Faculty include Deborah Wingert, and Marina Stavitskaya. Guest faculty for the 2008–2009 year are Jared Angle (New York City Ballet), Natalia Boesch (American Ballet Theatre), Sébastien Marcovici (New York City Ballet), Janie Taylor (New York City Ballet), Daniel Ulbricht (New York City Ballet), Roman Zhurbin (American Ballet Theatre), Karin Averty (Paris Opera Ballet), and Flavio Salazar (American Ballet Theatre). Francois Perron was Managing Director 2001 - 2011.

In addition to the enrolled students, dancers from the School of American Ballet and the Jacqueline Kennedy Onassis School are permitted to audit classes at Studio Maestro.

The annual Spring Gala Performance for 2008 included excerpts of classics by George Balanchine, Marius Petipa, Martha Graham, Bryan Arias-Diaz, and Tom Baird.
