= Richard Move =

American choreographer

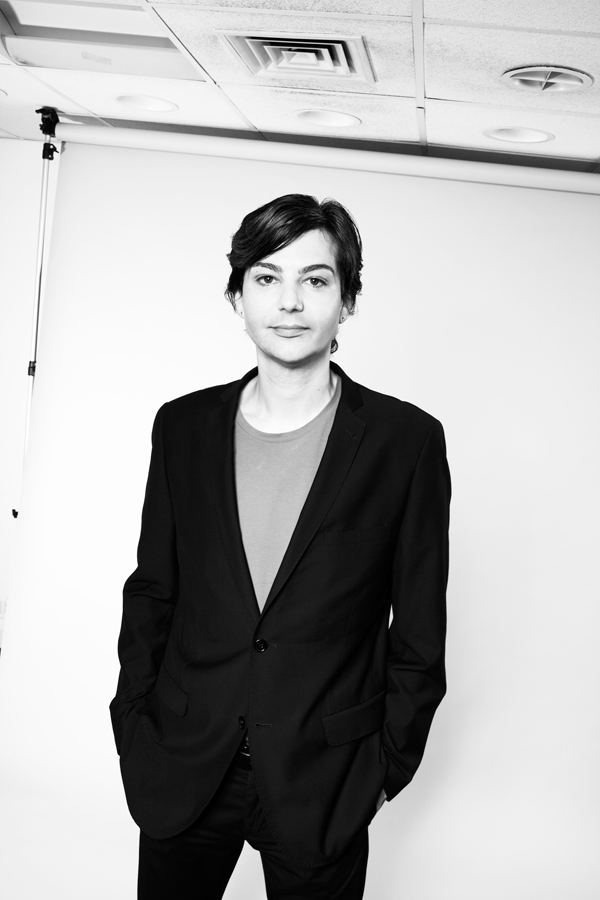
- Richard Move (Photograph by Philip Habib)
- Born: New York City
- Education: Virginia Commonwealth University (BFA); City College of New York (MFA); New York University (MA); New York University (M.Phil.); New York University (Ph.D.)
- Occupations: Choreographer, performer, director, filmmaker, assistant professor at New York University
- Height: 6 ft 4 in (1.93 m)
- Website: move-itproductions.com

Richard Move is an American choreographer, dancer, performing artist, director, and filmmaker. They are the Artistic Director of MoveOpolis! and Move- It! Productions. Move is known for their interest in Martha Graham and the ability to recreate her performances. They are a TEDGlobal Oxford Fellow and was named 1 of 12 TED Fellows who inspire by producing art that confronts social injustice, and provokes action. Move is Assistant Arts Professor at New York University in the Tisch School of the Arts’ Department of Dance.

In 2018, Move was Artist in Residence at Pratt Institute and Monash University’s MADA (Monash Art, Design and Architecture) Artist in Residence in Melbourne, Australia. From 2014 – 2019, Move served as Assistant Professor of Dance in the Department of Drama, Theatre and Dance at Queens College, CUNY and from 2012-2014, as Lecturer in Design at Yale School of Drama.

== Early life and education ==
Born in New York City and raised in Virginia, Richard Move studied theater and dance in high school and first experienced Martha Graham's work on a high school field trip to Washington D.C. Move said of Graham, "The dance was beyond my comprehension at the time, but I understood it was mythic and dramatic and so sexy and violent." They studied dance at Virginia Commonwealth University and graduated with a Bachelor of Fine Arts. They also trained for three years as a scholarship student at the American Dance Festival at Duke University.

While performing internationally with many dance-theater companies, from the Karole Armitage Ballet to DANCENOISE, Move worked as a go-go dancer and performed in many nightclubs throughout the world. Their birth name was Richard Winberg but was given the stage name Move by those they worked with in the nightclub industry. They were co-founder of Jackie 60, one of New York City's longest running and most exclusive avant-garde nightclubs.

Move earned a Master of Fine Arts in Media Arts Production from City College of New York and a Master of Arts and Master of Philosophy degrees in Performance Studies from New York University. Move earned a Ph.D. in Performance Studies at New York University, where they curated and produced the controversial Ana Mendieta documentary Where is Ana Mendieta? 25 Years Later - An Exhibition and Symposium, which included his film, BloodWork - The Ana Mendieta Story. Art in America noted, "The overwhelming turnout for the symposium-turned-courtroom drama was much larger than the venue…the only such events to ever explicitly confront the circumstances surrounding her death and to overtly frame Carl Andre's acquittal of her murder as unjust."

== Career ==
One of their best-known works, Martha@... on the life and work of Martha Graham was created in 1996, and received two New York Dance and Performance Awards. Move has performed nearly 30 dances by Graham including Lamentation, Clytemnestra, Episodes and Phaedra.

Their films include Strangers With Candy (2006), Bardo (2009), recipient of the Jury Prize nomination at Lincoln Center's Dance on Camera Festival and BloodWork-The Ana Mendieta Story (2009), recipient of the National Board of Review Award/CityVisions at the Directors Guild of America. Move's feature film GhostLight (2003) had its World Premiere at the Tribeca Film Festival, is distributed by Palisades Tartan and was released on DVD in June 2012. GhostLight also stars Ann Magnuson with Isaac Mizrahi, Deborah Harry and Mark Morris. Reviews of Ghostlight include "Glorious" by A.O. Scott of The New York Times and "Richard Move is magnificent...Graham herself couldn't have done better." by Jami Bernard of The Daily News. Move is Director and Producer of GIMP-The Documentary, which premiered at the 2014, Film Society of Lincoln Center’s Dance on Camera Festival.

In 2017, they appeared in "SlowDancing/TrioA," a large scale video installation by artist, David Michalek, in collaboration with choreographer, Yvonne Rainer at New York's Danspace Project." Move performed in DANCENOISE: Show at the Whitney Museum of American Art's 2015 retrospective.

They have also created many musicals and dance performances. Some of their most famous are Martha@..., Le Petomane (2006 and 2011), winner of the Outstanding Musical Award at the New York Fringe Festival, and Lamentation Variations (2007) commissioned by the Martha Graham Dance Company. Martha@... continues to be of great interest and "[Move] sees no shortage of interest or material."

Some critics do not like Richard Move's versions of Graham's dances and accuse him of false interpretations. Others regard Move as "The definitive, living history of one of dance's great artists."Martha@...The 1963 Interview, named "Best of 2011" by ARTFORUM International, Time Out and numerous other publications, had its World Premiere at New York's Dance Theater Workshop in March 2011 and returned for encore performances in November 2011 at New York Live Arts. Roslyn Sulcas' review in The New York Times entitled, "Martha Graham Lives, and Is Interviewed" described Martha@...The 1963 Interview with, "Move brilliantly incarnates her..." The production also featured Tony Award winning actress and playwright, Lisa Kron in the role originated by the late author and actor David Rakoff, and was presented at the 2014 Singapore International Festival of Arts. Move's Martha@ continues to be presented internationally, including their work Martha@The Ravello Festival in Italy, in 2016. In 2017, Move presented the world premiere staging of Martha Graham’s little known 1928 solo, Immigrant, at the Isabella Stewart Gardner Museum in Boston, Massachusetts, which was commissioned by the Museum.

In 2017, Move was commissioned by New York Live Arts to create the opening event of the annual Live Ideas Festival and premiered two new works, XXYY, exploring the gender identity spectrum and Martha@20, a 20th anniversary edition of Martha@.... In an interview with The New York Times, Move spoke of the political importance of XXYY and told Siobhan Burke, "We seem to have taken a pretty large step backward in terms of understanding gender identity and accepting minoritarian sexuality. Look at the statistics around these lives, from the New York City Anti-Violence Project — they’re staggering." New York Times critic Brian Seibert noted, "The greatest fascination of the program lay in the contrast ... Through Move, these voices spoke to each other, and to us."

At the Museum of Modern Art (MoMA) in 2013, Move appeared as Graham in 20 Dancers for the XX Century, about which The New York Times said, "…Move also was the art. The Graham choreography they performed was an exhibit, yet so were they: a dancer as a living archive of dance.” Conceived by Boris Charmatz’ Musée de la Danse, “… Move and 19 other distinguished dancers inhabited spaces all through the building…” The Financial Times stated, “Best of all was Richard Move’s setting…They caught her tragic Clytemnestra between the two massive screens for Douglas Gordon’s life-sized videos of elephants tromping then rolling helplessly on a Gagosian Gallery floor.” Move was on exhibit as Graham at Singapore’s Asian Civilisations Museum in 2014.

Move was named one of "25 to Watch" by Dance Magazine and The New York Times has published six Sunday "Arts and Leisure" features on their work.

As Artistic Director of MoveOpolis! their dance, theater and interdisciplinary works have been presented internationally. MoveOpolis! collaborators regularly include such notable figures as fashion designer Patricia Field (Sex and the City, The Devil Wears Prada), maverick filmmaker and visual artist Charles Atlas and writer Hilton Als (The New Yorker). Move's The Show (Achilles Heels), originally commissioned and performed by Mikhail Baryshnikov and the White Oak Dance Project, has been hailed by Dance Magazine as "...a powerful, iconoclastic theater piece that's made to measure for 21st Century." And, by The Star Ledger as "A brilliant work and the most revolutionary work Baryshnikov has commissioned." The Show (Achilles Heels) had its New York premiere at The Kitchen, featuring Rock and Roll Hall of Fame inductee, Deborah Harry of Blondie and Rasta Thomas in the leading role originally created for Mikhail Baryshnikov. In 2013, the Martha Graham Dance Company premiered The Show (Achilles Heels) at New York's Joyce Theater. The Financial Times review headline read, "Graham's 'Phaedra' was impressive for its storytelling, but it was another choreographer’s work that stole the show,” and proclaimed Move's work an "...hour long tour de force...now set on the Graham company, where it deserves a long life."

Move's other choreographic commissions include acclaimed works for PARADIGM (Carmen DeLavallade, Gus Solomons, Jr., and Dudley Williams), the American Festival of Paris, the Opera Ballet of Florence, Italy and for New York City Ballet Principal, Helene Alexopoulos, which The New York Times reviewed as "…stunning…first rate work from both." Move also conceives, directs and stages large-scale, multi-media events including productions for the European Cultural Capitol of France, the Guggenheim Museum in New York, the VH1/Vogue Fashion Awards, and, in 2014, at the Parrish Art Museum.

They choreographed Dame Shirley Bassey's Diamonds are Forever at the Cannes Film Festival AMFAR Gala and directed Isaac Mizrahi in his acclaimed one-man show, LES MIZrahi, "Director Richard Move and Mizrahi have created a triumph." Time Out. They also produced and directed the infamous professional wrestler, The Iron Sheik, in his one-man show, which previewed at Caroline's in New York City.

Move's many television appearances include A&E's Role Reversal, HBO's Emmy Award-winning The Artist is Present, Sundance Channel's Iconoclasts, A&E's Biography, BBC's Bourne to Dance and PBS' City Arts, on Move's work, which received an Emmy Award.

Their other stage credits include Edward Albee's Who's Afraid of Virginia Woolf? The FUSION Theater Company of New Mexico's controversial 2004 production featured Move as Martha in this iconic masterpiece. "No sharper black wit can be found in American theater, and this cast wield that wit with the precision of brain surgeons."

== Cease and Desist ==
Move’s Cease and Desist requests include those from the Martha Graham Entities, The Estate of Ana Mendieta and Edward Albee.

== Publication ==
- "God Save Petronio! - In the Paradise of First Grace," in "ALLY:" Janine Antoni, Anna Halprin and Stephen Petronio. ( Hirmer Publishers, 2018)
- "Sonic Bodies, Seizures and Spells" in The Oxford Handbook of Dance and Reenactment (Oxford University Press; 1st edition, 2017)
- “The Sovereign Soloist – States of Exceptional Labor and State of Darkness" in Rhythm Field – The Dances of Molissa Fenley (Seagull Press/Enactments Series edited by Richard Schechner, 2015)
- Introduction – “Where is Ana Mendieta?” in Where is Ana Mendieta? 25 Years Later – An Exhibition and Symposium Dossier (Women & Performance, Routledge Press, 2011)
- Introduction – "On Part Real, Part Dream" in Part Real, Part Dream, Dancing with Martha Graham by Stuart Hodes (Concord Press, 2011)
- Exhibition Catalogue – Where is Ana Mendieta? 25 Years Later – An Exhibition and Symposium (Fales Library and Special Collections, New York University, 2010)

Move is recipient of numerous awards including grants from Creative Capital and the Foundation for Contemporary Performance.
