= Martha Graham Center of Contemporary Dance =

Headquarters of a dance company in New York City, U.S.

Coordinates: 40.7626°N 73.9619°W

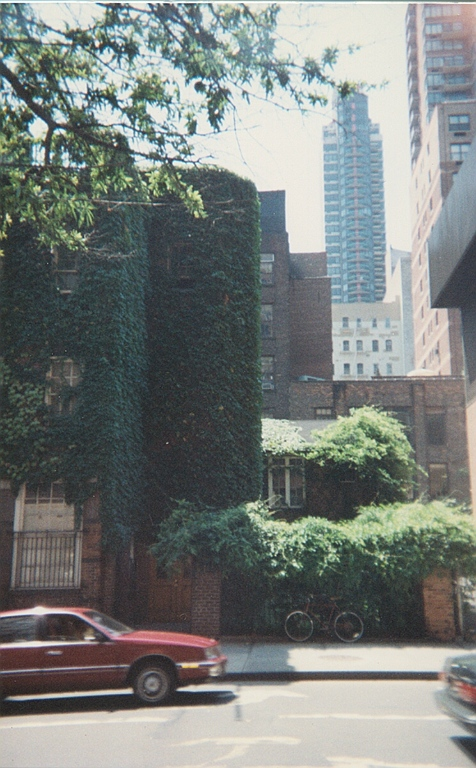
Martha Graham School headquarters as of 1994, at 316 East 63rd Street, New York. Though the school has since moved from this location, this is the last studio that Martha Graham herself taught in.

Martha Graham Center of Contemporary Dance is located in New York City and is the headquarters to the Martha Graham School of Contemporary Dance and the Martha Graham Dance Company, which is the oldest continually performing contemporary dance company in the world. The School is focused on teaching Graham's technique; some of its faculty were trained by Graham herself.

== History ==
The center was founded in 1926 by Martha Graham. Its first headquarters consisted of a small dance studio on Broadway. The center later moved to a two-story building at 316 East 63rd Street, New York. (Photo on right by Dean Speer, taken after he had taken a class at "the Source." 1994. Caption authored by Speer as well.)

After Martha Graham's death in 1991, the center's leadership was debated. In her will, Martha Graham left Ron Protas as heir to her estate. Protas claimed ownership of the rights to Graham's name and choreographic oeuvre, and sued the Martha Graham Dance Company for trademark infringement. After years of legal battles, the Martha Graham Dance Company was ruled the owner of the Graham name and almost all of her repertoire. During the dispute, Protas was voted out of his position as artistic director of the company.

In 2005, the center was among 406 New York City arts and social service institutions to receive part of a $20 million grant from the Carnegie Corporation, which was made possible through a donation that was given by the New York City mayor Michael Bloomberg.

Since 2005, Janet Eilber has been the artistic director.

== See also ==
- Martha Graham
- Graham technique
- Modern Dance
- Denishawn
- Carolyn Adams (dancer)
- Lee Lee Lan
