= Martha Graham Dance Company =

Dance company founded by Martha Graham

The Martha Graham Dance Company, founded by Martha Graham in April 1926, is both the oldest dance company in the United States and the oldest integrated dance company. The company is critically acclaimed in the artistic world and has been recognized as "one of the great dance companies of the world" by the New York Times and as "one of the seven wonders of the artistic universe" by The Washington Post.

Many of the great 20th- and 21st-century modern dancers and choreographers began at the Martha Graham Dance Company, including: Merce Cunningham, Erick Hawkins, Pearl Lang, Pascal Rioult, Miriam Pandor, Anna Sokolow, and Paul Taylor. The repertoire of 181 works also includes guest performances from Mikhail Baryshnikov, Claire Bloom, Margot Fonteyn, Liza Minnelli, Rudolf Nureyev, Maya Plisetskaya, and Kathleen Turner.

== Past ==
=== Location and inception ===
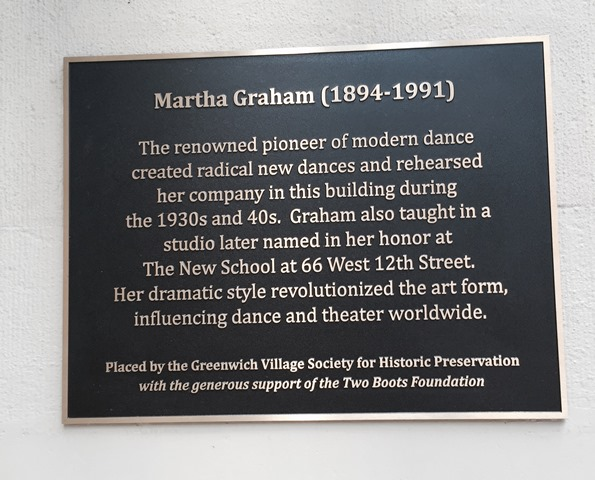
On June 9, 2013 the Greenwich Village Society for Historic Preservation unveiled this plaque at 66 Fifth Avenue where Graham had her studio in the 1930s and 1940s.

Graham began teaching in her studio at 66 Fifth Avenue, near 13th Street, and at the Neighborhood Playhouse in New York. Here she taught her special dance technique to the women who would become the first members of her dance company. They would practice new works for nine months and then give recitals in New York and abroad. During the years of 1938 and 1939, men joined the troupe. Later on, financial troubles would plague the company. At these times, Graham was supported by individual patrons. One of the contributors, Mrs. Wallace, made it possible for the Martha Graham Center of Contemporary Dance find its current home at 316 East 63rd Street.

=== Early works ===
Many of Graham's early works were austere. She designed her own costumes and neglected scenery. In 1930, she choreographed "Lamentation", a piece in which the dancer's expressed emotion is aided by the Graham's choice in fabric. There are two major themes present in Graham's work: Amerindian experience and Greek mythology. Her work "Primitive Mysteries", choreographed in 1931, was created after her visit to the American Southwest, and is a re-enactment of the ritual in honor of the Virgin Mary. It is set in three movements: the first movement is based around the birth of Jesus, the second Jesus' crucifixion, and the third Mary going to heaven.

Her work “Frontier” is the first piece she created with scenery: a fence and two ropes. It was a female solo that premiered in 1935 with music by Horst.

Her company was all female until she created her first male-female duet in 1938, “American Document”. In the movement entitled ‘Puritan Episode’ she danced with her future husband, Erick Hawkins. Hawkins became her lead male dancer for the company and her frequent dance partner. The two danced together in her most famous Americana piece “Appalachian Spring”. The piece premiered in 1944, set to music by Aaron Copland.

=== After Graham's death ===
After Graham's death the company ran into financial and legal troubles. In her will, Graham left her legacy to Ron Protas giving him all rights to her choreography. His dispute with the Board of Directors came in the midst of financial troubles and talks of closing down the dance center. Protas responded by refusing to allow the company to perform Graham's works. This legal battle was fueled by the company's recent dry spell. Public funding had been cut for a few decades, but after Graham's death, private investors began holding out as well. The company performed on and off for the next decade. In 2000, the company canceled performances for the year and came close to bankruptcy. By 2004, the company began to perform again after two supreme court cases with Ron Protas, both of which the company won.

== Present ==
=== Performances ===
The Martha Graham Dance Company continues to both perform Graham's works and create new ones based on the technique she developed. Early works are a part of the "long woolen period" and include works such as "Primitive Mysteries" and "El Penitente". Later, Graham turned to America for inspiration and created works such as "American Document", "American Provincials", "Appalachian Spring", "Letter to the World" and "Salem Shore". Later she turned to Hebrew and Greek mythology for "Cave of the Heart", "Night Journey", "Errand Into the Maze", "Judith", "The Witch of Endor", "Phaedra" and "Clytemnestra". Her later works reflected her retirement as they stopped including a main heroine and focused on more abstract concepts. All of these works are still included in the company's repertoire and are occasionally performed.

=== Current company ===
In 2005, Janet Eilber became Artistic Director and Denise Vale took the position of Senior Artistic Associate. In 2015, principal dancers included: Tadej Brdnik, PeiJu Chien-Pott, Carrie Ellmore-Tallitsch, Lloyd Knight, Mariya Dashkina Maddux and Blakeley White-McGuire. Soloists include: Abdiel Jacobsen, Ben Schultz and XiaoChuan Xie. Dancers include: Natasha M. Diamond-Walker, Charlotte Landreau, Lloyd Mayor, Ari Mayzick, Lauren Newman, Lorenzo Pagano, Lucy Postell and Ying Xin.

In recent years, Eilber has invited contemporary choreographers to contribute short pieces inspired by Graham’s "Lamentations" (1930). Participating artists include Yvonne Rainer, Lar Lubovitch, Liz Gerring, Richard Move, and Aszure Barton.

In March and April 2026, to coincide with the Martha Graham Dance Company's 100th anniversary, PBS aired a two-part documentary entitled Martha Graham Dance Company: We Are Our Time, which took three years of behind-the-scenes filming with the company to produce. In 2025 the company announced a move to Times Square in the Paramount Building.

== Notable former dancers ==
- Terese Capucilli
- PeiJu Chien-Pott
- Christine Dakin
- Irene Emery
- Masha Dashkina Maddux
- Virginie Mécène
- Blakeley White-McGuire

== See also ==
- Martha Graham
- Martha Graham Center of Contemporary Dance
