= Horizon (disambiguation) =

The horizon is the line at which the sky and the Earth's surface appear to meet.

Horizon or The Horizon may also refer to:

== Arts, entertainment and media ==
=== Art ===
- Horizontes (Horizons), 1913 painting by Francisco Antonio Cano Cardona
- Horizons (ballet), a modern dance work
- Horizons, a sculpture by Neil Dawson

=== Films ===
- Horizon (1932 film), a Soviet film
- The Horizon (film), a 1961 Soviet film
- Horizon (1971 film), a Hungarian film
- The Horizon (1984 film), a Japanese film directed by Kaneto Shindo
- Horizon (1989 film), an Iranian film
- Horizon (Arabic: الأفق), a 2013 Jordanian short film by Zain Duraie
- Horizon (2018 film), a Georgian film
- Horizon: An American Saga, a planned series of four American epic Western films
  - Horizon: An American Saga – Chapter 1
  - Horizon: An American Saga – Chapter 2
  - Horizon: An American Saga – Chapter 3

=== Music ===
==== Bands ====
- Horizon (band), a German metal band
- Hori7on, a South Korea-based Filipino boy band

==== Albums ====
- Horizon (The Carpenters album), 1975
- Horizon (Culture Beat album), 1991
- Horizon (Eddie Rabbitt album), 1980
- Horizon (Remioromen album), 2006
- Horizon (Sun Ra album), 1972
- Horizon (McCoy Tyner album), 1979
- Horizon, by BZN
- Horizons (Kris Allen album), 2014
- Horizons (Beyond the Black album), 2020
- Horizons (Charles McPherson album), 1968
- Horizons (Parkway Drive album), 2007
- Horizons (Starset album), 2021
- Horizons (Ira Sullivan album), 1987
- Horizon (The Rocking Horse Winner album), 2002

==== Songs ====
- "Horizon" (song), a 2023 single by Jaehyun
- "Horizon", Melodifestivalen 2021 entry by Jessica Andersson
- "Horizon", by Akina Hakamori from Possibility
- "Horizon", by Aldous Harding from Party
- "Horizon", by The Arrogant Worms from their album C'est Cheese
- "Horizon", by Ateez from the EP Treasure Epilogue: Action to Answer
- "Horizon", by The Bats from At the National Grid
- "Horizon", by Cat Power from Wanderer
- "Horizon", by Daft Punk from Random Access Memories
- "Horizon", by D'espairsRay from Redeemer
- "Horizon", by Diaura from Triangle
- "Horizon", by Genesis from Foxtrot
- "Horizon", by Mercenary from First Breath
- "Horizon", by Nickelback from Get Rollin'
- "Horizon", by Taemin from the EP Eternal
- "Horizon", by Warbringer from IV: Empires Collapse
- "Horizons", by LTJ Bukem
- "Horizons", by Trenches from Reckoner
- "Horizons", by the 3rd and the Mortal from Painting on Glass

=== Publications ===
==== Periodicals ====
- Horizon (American magazine), 1958–1989, originally published by American Heritage
- Horizon (British magazine), 1940–1949, founded by Cyril Connolly, Stephen Spender and Peter Watson
- Horizon (online magazine), research and innovation magazine published by the European Commission
- Horizon Weekly, Armenian-Canadian newspaper publication
- Horizons (magazine), research magazine of the Swiss National Science Foundation and the Swiss Academies of Arts and Sciences
- Horizons (journal), a religious study journal
- The Horizon: A Journal of the Color Line, U.S. magazine, 1907–1919, edited by W.E.B. Du Bois
- Horizons (periodical), in-house journal of the Royal Automobile Club of Western Australia

==== Works ====
- Horizon (novel), a 2009 fantasy novel by Lois McMaster Bujold

=== Television ===
- Horizon (British TV programme), a long-running British programme on BBC television showing popular science documentaries
- Horizon (Canadian TV program), a 1963–1964 Canadian current affairs television program that aired on CBC
- Arizona Horizon, a current events television program that debuted Arizona-based KAET in 1981
- "Horizon" (Star Trek: Enterprise), a 2003 second-season episode of Star Trek: Enterprise
- "The Horizon" (Alias), a 2005 episode
- Pokémon Horizons: The Series, the 26th season of the Pokémon anime series
  - Pokémon Horizons – The Search for Laqua, the follow-up 27th season
  - Pokémon Horizons – Rising Hope, the follow-up 28th season
  - Pokémon Horizons – Wonders Ahead, the follow-up 29th season

=== Web series ===
- The Horizon (web series), which premiered on YouTube

=== Video games ===
- Horizon (video game series), a series of action role-playing games developed by Guerrilla Games
  - Horizon Zero Dawn, 2017, for the PlayStation 4 and Microsoft Windows
  - Horizon Forbidden West, a 2022 sequel for PlayStation 4, PlayStation 5 and Microsoft Windows
- Horizons: Empire of Istaria, the original name of the MMORPG Istaria: Chronicles of the Gifted
- Forza Horizon, a 2012 open world racing game for Xbox 360, which became a sub-series for the Forza racing game franchise
- Animal Crossing: New Horizons, 2020, for the Nintendo Switch
- Horizon, a playable character in the game Apex Legends

== Organizations ==
=== Companies ===
- Horizon (camera), a swing-lens panoramic camera manufactured in Russia
- Horizon Fitness, a fitness equipment subsidiary of Johnson Health Tech
- Horizon Fuel Cell Technologies, a corporation specializing in fuel cell technology
- Horizon Nuclear Power, a British energy company
- Horizon Organic, an American company that produces dairy and egg products
- Horizon Pipeline, a small natural gas pipeline that moves gas in northern Illinois
- Horizon Power, a corporation owned by the Government of Western Australia
- Horizons Satellite, a joint venture between Intelsat and SKY Perfect JSAT Group that owns a fleet of Horizons satellites
- Horizon (store), a discount department store
- Horizon Records, an American record label
- Horizon Therapeutics, a biopharmaceutical company
- Warner Horizon Television, Warner Bros Television’s division formed in 2006

=== Events ===
- Horizons Gorwelion, an annual festival aimed at promoting independent contemporary new music in Wales
- Orizzonti (Horizons), a parallel section of the Venice Film Festival

=== Radio and television providers ===
- Horizont (radio station), or Horizon Radio, a state-owned Bulgarian Radio Station
- Heart 103.3, or Horizon Radio (UK), a UK radio station

=== Schools ===
- École secondaire l'Horizon, a French public secondary school in Quebec, Canada
- Horizon High School (disambiguation)
- Horizon Science Academy, a group of charter schools which is owned by Concept Schools in Ohio, US

=== Other organizations ===
- Horizon League, a collegiate athletic conference in the midwestern US
- Horizon 2020, a funding programme by the European Union for innovation and economic growth
- Horizon Europe, continuation of Horizon 2020
- Horizons (political party), French center-right political party
- Horizon Health Network, a health authority or hospital network in New Brunswick, Canada

== Places ==
- Horizons Region, official name of the Manawatu-Whanganui region in New Zealand
- Horizon, Saskatchewan, hamlet in Saskatchewan, Canada
- Rosemont Horizon, the former name of Allstate Arena, a multipurpose arena in Rosemont, Illinois, US
- Horizon City, Texas , a town in Texas, US
- Horizons (Epcot), a former Epcot Center attraction at Walt Disney World

== Science ==
=== Computing ===
- Horizon effect, in artificial intelligence, the computational limit beyond which conventional game-tree search algorithms make suboptimal decisions
- Horizons: Software Starter Pack, a 1982 software compilation for the Sinclair ZX Spectrum
- North Star Horizon, an 8-bit computer system based on the ZiLOG Z80A microprocessor
- Split horizon route advertisement, one of the methods in computer networks used to prevent routing loops
- Omnissa Horizon, a commercial desktop-virtualisation product released in 2014 (formerly called VMware Horizon and VMware Horizon View)
- Nintendo Switch system software, internally known as Horizon
- Horizon, a social platform being built by Meta Platforms, encompassing Horizon Home, Horizon Worlds, Horizon Workrooms, Horizon Venues and Horizon Marketplace
- Horizon accounting system, the Fujitsu IT and accounting system at the heart of the British Post Office scandal

=== Earth science and archeology ===
- Horizon (archaeology), a distinctive sediment, artefact, style or other cultural trait that is found at archaeological sites across a large geographical area
- Horizon (geology), a bedding plane or a thin bed of distinctive character within a stratigraphic sequence
- Marker horizon, a distinctive stratigraphic unit, of the same age across several locations
- Soil horizon, a specific and distinctive layer in a land area

=== Physics ===
- Horizon (general relativity), which plays a role in Einstein's theory of general relativity
- Absolute horizon, a boundary in spacetime in general relativity inside of which events cannot affect an external observer
- Apparent horizon, a surface defined in general relativity
- Cauchy horizon, a surface found in the study of Cauchy problems
- Celestial horizon, a great circle parallel to the horizon
- Cosmological horizon, a limit of observability: the maximum distance from which particles can have travelled to an observer in the age of the universe
- Event horizon, a boundary in spacetime beyond which events cannot affect the observer
- JPL Horizons On-Line Ephemeris System, an interactive facility that computes the position of many solar system objects
- Killing horizon, a null surface on which there is a Killing vector field
- Radio horizon, the locus of points in telecommunication at which direct rays from an antenna are tangential to the surface of the Earth

== Transportation ==
- Horizon (railcar), an Amtrak passenger car used mostly in the Midwest
- Attitude indicator, or Artificial horizon, an instrument used in an aircraft to inform the pilot of the orientation of the airplane relative to the ground
- Carnival Horizon, a cruise ship operated by Carnival Cruise Line
- Chrysler Horizon, also known as the Talbot Horizon, a compact hatchback designed by Chrysler Europe
- Honda Horizon, an SUV based on the Isuzu Trooper
- Fisher Horizon, a kit aircraft
- Hawker Horizon, the original name of the Hawker 4000 business jet
- Halman Horizon, a Canadian sailboat design
- Horizon Air, a regional airline and subsidiary of the Alaska Air Group
- Horizon Airlines (Australia), an Australian airline based in Sydney
- Horizon-class frigate, a multi-national collaboration to produce a new generation of anti-air warfare frigates
- MV Horizon, a cruise ship operated by Pullmantur Cruises

== Other uses ==
- Project Horizon, a study to determine the feasibility of the construction of a military base on the moon conducted in 1959
- Fusion of horizons, a philosophical understanding that results from the dynamic process of integrating the 'Other' and the familiar
- Time horizon, the amount of time an organisation will look into the future when preparing a strategic plan

== See also ==
- Gorizont (disambiguation)
- Horizont (disambiguation)
- Mirage, a naturally occurring optical phenomenon
- New Horizon (disambiguation)
- New Horizons (disambiguation)
