= Don't count your chickens before they hatch =

Proverb

"Don't count your chickens before they hatch", also "Don't count your chickens before they are hatched", is a proverb suggesting that it is unwise to depend on prediction of any object's future state.

== History ==
In a 1568-1575 poem "Newe sonets, and pretie pamphlets." containing advice to a friend, Thomas Howell wrote

Counte not thy Chickens that vnhatched be,
Waye wordes as winde, till thou finde certaintée:
For filid wordes that deeds do neuer yeelde,
May well be likened to the baren fielde.

Note: "Waye" means "weigh", "filid" i.e. "filed" means "polished". The moralizing about "wordes" without work was also in the contemporary Bishops' Bible: "In euery labour there is some profite: but vayne wordes bryng foorth onely penurie."

In a 1663 poem Hudibras, discussing effects of an astrologer's predictions, Samuel Butler wrote

Make Fools believe in their fore-seeing
Of things before they are in Being;
To swallow gudgeons ere they're catch'd,
And count their chickens ere they're hatch'd.

Note: a gudgeon is a small fish.

In John Ray's 1670 "A collection of English proverbs" the phrase appears as "Count not your chickens before they be hatch't." Similar phrases occur in a ballad that was printed in London between 1685 and 1688.

In Jefferys Taylor's 1820 "Aesop in Rhyme, with some Originals", there is an original tale The Milkmaid. She makes a series of calculations involving ever-more-profitable sales of milk then eggs then chickens then a cow and geese and turkeys and pigs -- but then she tosses her head and loses the milk. The ending is

This moral, I think, may be safely attach'd ;
Reckon not on your chickens before they are hatch'd.

Taylor's poem was based on book 7 of La Fontaine's Fables written in 1678, specifically The milkmaid and her pail, rather than Aesop.

== In music ==
Bob Wills recorded "Don't Count Your Chickens" in 1941.

Lainey Wilson recorded "Counting Chickens" as part of the album Whirlwind in 2024.

== In poultry management ==
The proverb is generally applied for any situations where hope of profit cannot be equated with present value, rather than for chicken farms. However, calculating potential egg production more accurately is possible with modern science. For example, in 2023, Pieter Devuyst, in Horizon (online magazine), in an article titled "Counting male chickens before they hatch means good news for ethical farming", addresses a problem that animal-rights activists have identified.

== In other fields ==
The proverb has been quoted in relation to the stock market, accounting, economics, medicine, law, literature, and politics.

The proverb has been included in dictionaries and lists of common English phrases.
