= Gorizont (disambiguation) =

Gorizont is a series of Soviet and Russian satellites.

Gorizont, Russian for "horizon", may also refer to:

- Gorizont (film), or The Horizon, a 1961 Soviet drama film
- Gorizont (geology), a unit of Russian stratigraphy
- Gorizont (newspaper), a Russian-language newspaper in Colorado, U.S.

== See also ==
- Horizon (disambiguation)
- Horizont (disambiguation)
