= The milkmaid and her pail =

Folk tale

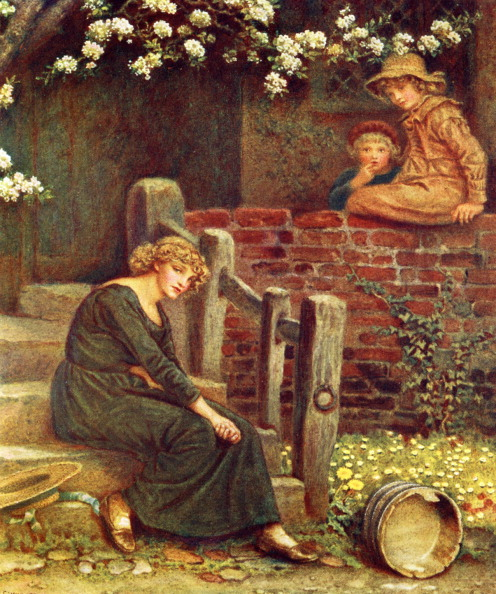
'The fable of the girl and her milk pail' by Kate Greenaway, 1893

The Milkmaid and Her Pail is a folktale of Aarne-Thompson-Uther type 1430 about interrupted daydreams of wealth and fame. Ancient tales of this type exist in the East but Western variants are not found before the Middle Ages. It was only in the 18th century that the story about the daydreaming milkmaid began to be attributed to Aesop, although it was included in none of the main collections and does not appear in the Perry Index. In more recent times, the fable has been variously treated by artists and set by musicians.

== The stories ==
=== In the East ===
There is a theme common to the many different stories of this type that involves poor persons daydreaming of future wealth arising from a temporary possession. When they get carried away by their fantasy and start acting it out, they break the container on which their dream is founded and find themselves worse off. One of the earliest is included in the Indian Panchatantra as "The brahman who built air-castles". There a man speculates about the wealth that will flow from selling a pot of grain that he has been given, progressing through a series of sales of animals until he has enough to support a wife and family. The child misbehaves, his wife takes no heed, so he kicks her and in doing so upsets the pot that was to make his fortune. Other variants include Bidpai's "The Poorman and the Flask of Oil", "The Barber's Tale of his Fifth Brother" from The 1001 Nights and the Jewish story of "The Dervish and the Honey Jar".

=== The Western fable ===
At its first appearance in the 14th century Dialogus creaturarum, the story was told as a cautionary fable of a milkmaid who engages in detailed financial calculations of her profits. In a Castilian form it is told under the title "Of what happened to a woman called Truhana" in Don Juan Manuel's Tales of Count Lucanor (1335), illustrating the lesson that you should 'Confine your thoughts to what is real'. In this case it is the jar of honey from which she hopes to enrich herself that Truhana unbalances from her head.

The story gained lasting popularity after it was included in La Fontaine's Fables (VII.10). The charm of La Fontaine's poetic form apart, however, it differs little from the version recorded in his source, Bonaventure des Périers' Nouvelles récréations et joyeux devis (1558). There the fable is made an example of the practice of alchemists, who are like 'a good woman that was carrying a pot of milk to market and reckoning up her account as follows: she would sell it for half a sou and with that would buy a dozen eggs which she would set to hatch and have from them a dozen chicks; when they were grown she would have them castrated and then they would fetch five sous each, so that'd be at least a crown with which she would buy two piglets, a male and a female, and farrow a dozen more from them once they were grown, and they'd sell for twenty sous a piece after raising, making twelve francs with which she'd buy a mare that would have a fine foal. It would be really nice as it grew up, prancing about and neighing. And so happy was the good woman imagining this that she began to frisk in imitation of her foal, and that made the pot fall and all the milk spill. And down tumbled with it her eggs, her chickens, her capons, her mare and foal, the whole lot.' This has led to the proverb "Don't count your chick(en)s until they hatch."

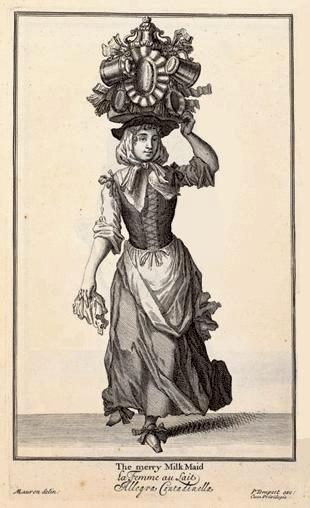
The Merry Milkmaid, after Marcellus Laroon (c. 1688)

In Britain the earliest appearance of the fable was in Bernard Mandeville's selection of adaptations from La Fontaine, which was published under the title Aesop dress'd (1704). The false connection with Aesop was continued by the story's reappearance in Robert Dodsley's Select fables of Esop and other fabulists (1761). Titled there "The country maid and her milk pail", it is prefaced with the sentiment that 'when men suffer their imagination to amuse them with the prospect of distant and uncertain improvements of their condition, they frequently sustain real losses by their inattention to those affairs in which they are immediately concerned'. The story is briefly told and ends with the pail being dislodged when the girl scornfully tosses her head in rejection of all the young men at the dance she was to attend, wearing a new dress to be bought with the proceeds of her commercial activities.

A different version was versified by Jefferys Taylor as "The Milkmaid" in his Aesop in Rhyme (1820). As in Bonaventure des Périers' telling, the bulk of the poem is given over to the long reckoning of prices. It ends with the maid toppling her pail by superciliously tossing her head in rejection of her former humble circumstances. The moral on which Taylor ends his poem is 'Reckon not your chickens before they are hatched', where a later collection has 'Count not...' The proverb fits the story and its lesson so well that one is tempted to speculate that it developed out of some earlier oral version of the fable, but the earliest recorded instance of it is in Thomas Howell's New Sonnets and Pretty Pamphlets (1570). The idiom used by La Fontaine in the course of his long conclusion is 'to build castles in Spain', of which he gives a few examples that make it clear that the meaning he intends is 'to dream of the impossible'. Avoiding that may well be what Bonaventure des Périers intended in telling his story too, but in the English versions the moral to be drawn is that to bring a plan to completion more than dreaming is required.

A version of the fable was written by the German poet Johann Wilhelm Ludwig Gleim in the 18th century. It differs little from other retellings, apart from its conclusion. The woman confesses what has happened to her husband, who advises her to live in the here and now and be content with what she has rather than 'building castles in air'. Here he uses the German equivalent of La Fontaine's idiom. The story has also provided German with another idiomatic phrase, 'milkmaid's reckoning' (Milchmädchenrechnung), used of drawing naïve and false conclusions.

== Artistic uses of the fable ==
Illustrations of La Fontaine's fables in books, limited as they are to the dismayed milkmaid looking down at her broken crock, are almost uniformly monotonous. An early exception is Jean-Baptiste Oudry's print in which the girl has fallen on her back (1755), an episode unsanctioned by the text. The explanation for the inelegant posture seems to be that the idiom la cruche casée (the broken pitcher) then meant the loss of virginity and so suggests a less innocent explanation of how the milk came to be spilt. Jean-Honoré Fragonard also depicts a fall in his picture of the fable (1770), although in this case the girl has tumbled forward and the smoke of her dreams spills from the pitcher at the same time as the milk. Other paintings that allude to the fable at the time include Jean-Baptiste Huet's "The milkmaid" (La Laitière, 1769) and François Boucher's "The little milkmaid" (1760). A Gobelins tapestry based on this was later to be presented to the king.

In the 19th century the story was taken up elsewhere. The American Symbolist, Albert Pinkham Ryder, painted his "Perrette" some time before 1890, taking its title from the name that La Fontaine gave his milkmaid. She walks abstractedly through a visionary landscape with the bucket balanced on her head. The Spanish Joaquín Sorolla y Bastida painted his "The Milkmaid" in 1890 and portrays a pensive girl seated on a flowering bank with her bucket overturned beside her. In Kate Greenaway's painting of 1893 she is seated instead on the steps of a cottage with the pail on the ground in a treatment that has been described as Pre-Raphaelite. In the following century, the fable is featured on one of Jean Vernon's (1897–1975) medals from the 1930s, where Perrette stands with a frieze of her lost beasts behind her.

The most celebrated statue of this subject is the bronze figure that the Russian artist Pavel Sokolov (1765–1831) made for the pleasure grounds planned by Tsar Nicholas I of Russia at his palace of Tsarskoye Selo. It shows the seated milkmaid weeping over her broken pot, which has been converted into a water feature by a channeled feed from a nearby spring. Originally it was called "Girl with a pitcher", but it became so celebrated that it is now better known as "The Milkmaid of Tsarskoye Selo". There is only a copy there today in what has become a public park, while the original is preserved in a St Petersburg museum. In fact several other copies have been made over the years. One was given by the wife of Nicholas I, the princess Charlotte of Prussia, as a birthday gift to her brother Karl in 1827. This was placed in the grounds of his Glienicke Palace near Berlin but was eventually destroyed during World War II; it is now replaced by a modern copy and is known as Die Milchfrau. Yet another was erected in the public park of Schloss Britz in 1998, and still another at Soukhanovo, near Moscow.

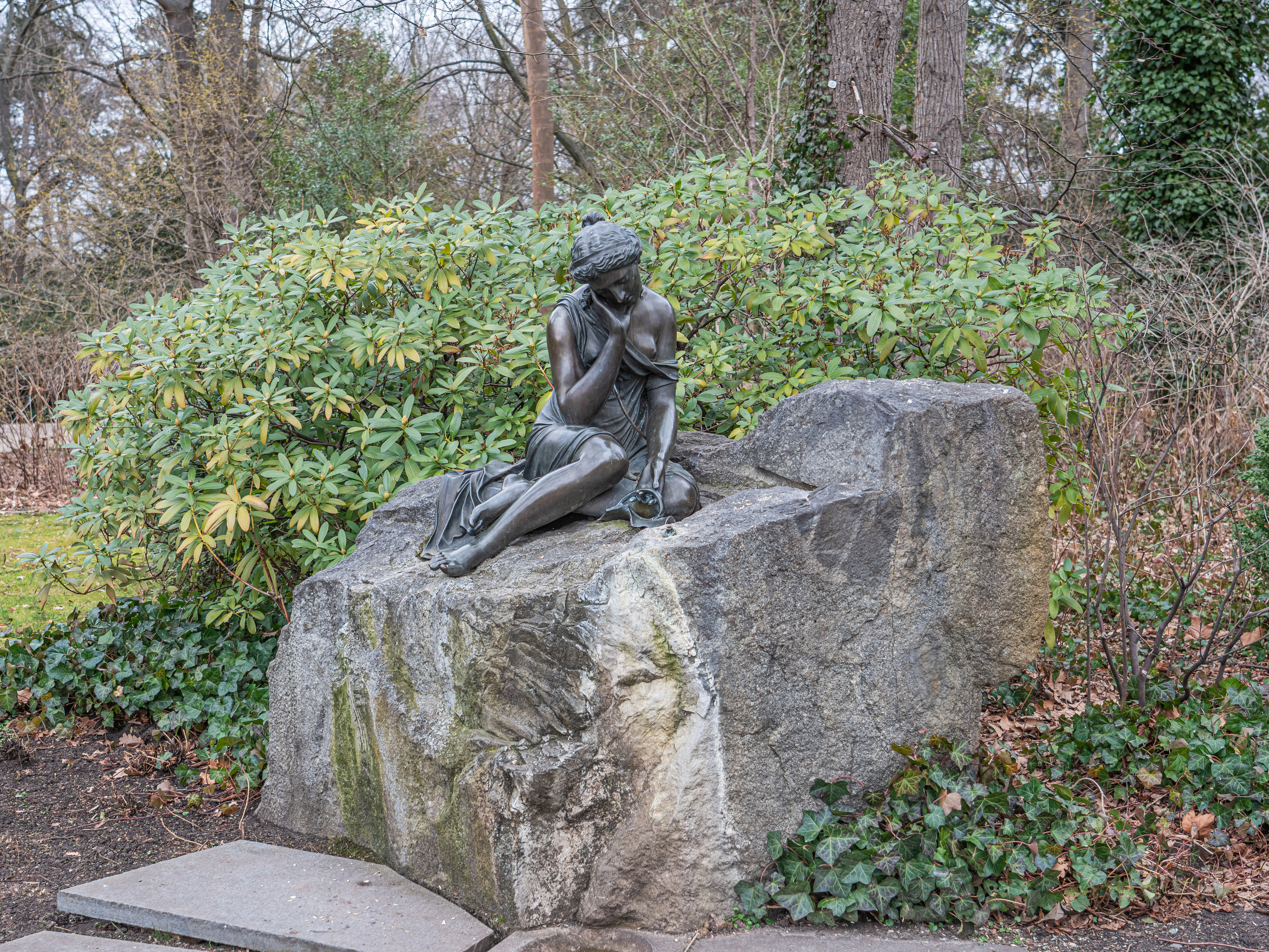
A copy of Pavel Sokolov's statue of The girl with the pitcher in the park of Britz Castle

One of the reasons for the original statue's celebrity as 'the muse of Tsarskoye Selo' was its connection with the writer Alexander Pushkin, who stayed there in 1831 and had been inspired to write the poem "The statue at Tsarskoye Selo".

One day a girl with an urn
Let it drop on the boulder beneath her.
Sadly she sits and alone,
Uselessly holding the pieces.

But see! What marvel is this?
For the water pours yet from her vessel.
There she continues today,
Her gaze on this endless spring.

The lyric was set for piano and alto voice in 1899 by Cesar Cui and is still performed today.

La Fontaine's fable has been set by a number of French composers:

- Jacques Offenbach as the fourth of his 6 Fables (1842)
- Benjamin Godard, the first of his Six Fables de La Fontaine (Op. 17 1872/9)
- Louis Lacombe for piano and voice (Op. 73.3, 1875)
- Abbé Léon-Robert Brice, who set it to a traditional melody, adjusting the poem to six-syllable lines to fit the music
- Isabelle Aboulker in the children's operetta La Fontaine et le Corbeau (1999)
