= Horizont =

Horizont may refer to:

- Horizont (camera), a Russian camera
- Horizont (film), or Horizon, a 1971 Hungarian film
- Horizont (radio station), a Bulgarian state-owned radio station
- Horizont Minsk, a Belarusian women's basketball club
- Horizont (company), in industry in Belarus, a home appliances producer
- Horizont, a neighborhood of Burgas, Bulgaria
- Horizont, a German trade journal published by Deutscher Fachverlag
- FK Horizont Turnovo,an association football club in North Macedonia

== See also ==
- Gorizont (disambiguation)
- Horizon (disambiguation)
