= New Horizon =

New Horizon may refer to:

== Education ==
- New Horizon (textbook), an English language textbook used by junior high school students in Japan
- New Horizon College of Engineering, an engineering college in Bangalore, India
- New Horizon Public School, ICSE School, in 100ft road, Indiranagar, Bangalore, India
- New Horizon Montessori School, an elementary school in Louisville, Tennessee, U.S.
- New Horizon School, a school for Muslim religious education in southern California, founded by Ahmad Adaya

== Music ==
- New Horizon Records, the label of GFK

=== Albums ===
- New Horizon (The Answer album) or the title song, 2013
- New Horizon (The Country Gentlemen album), 1992
- New Horizon (Isaac Hayes album), 1977
- New Horizon (JK Flesh album), 2018
- New Horizon (MYMP album), 2006
- New Horizon (Tak Matsumoto album) or the title song, 2014
- Aria Volume 2 - New Horizon, a compilation album in the Café del Mar Aria series, 1999
- new horizon (Hiro Takahashi album), 1995

=== Songs ===
- "New Horizon", by Frijid Pink from Earth Omen, 1972
- "New Horizon", by Midnattsol from Nordlys, 2008
- "New Horizon", by Royal Southern Brotherhood from Royal Southern Brotherhood, 2012
- "New Horizon", by Section 25 from Always Now, 1981
- "New Horizon (I Found You)", by Outrage from Outraged, 2013
- "A New Horizon", by Loose Ends from So Where Are You?, 1985
- "A New Horizon", by Xavier Naidoo & Naturally 7 from the Animals United soundtrack, 2010
- "A New Horizon - Tavnazian Archipelago", from the Final Fantasy XI Chains of Promathia Original Soundtrack, 2004

== Other uses ==
- New Horizon (film), 1940 Soviet drama film
- New Horizon Interactive, now Disney Online Studios Canada, an interactive graphics software company
- RV New Horizon, a research vessel of the Scripps Institution of Oceanography, San Diego
- Ulmus 'New Horizon', an elm hybrid
- A New Horizon, a 1990 documentary film by Nirad N. Mohapatra
- New Horizon, a novel by Abdur Rouf Choudhury
- "New Horizon", a storyline in the science fiction comedy webtoon series Live with Yourself!
- New Horizon Buses, bus company based in Brightlingsea
- New Horizon Conference, a series of annual conferences organized by Nader Talebzadeh among others

== See also ==
- New Horizons (disambiguation)
- Horizon (disambiguation)
