= Tales of Count Lucanor =

One of the earliest works of prose in Spanish

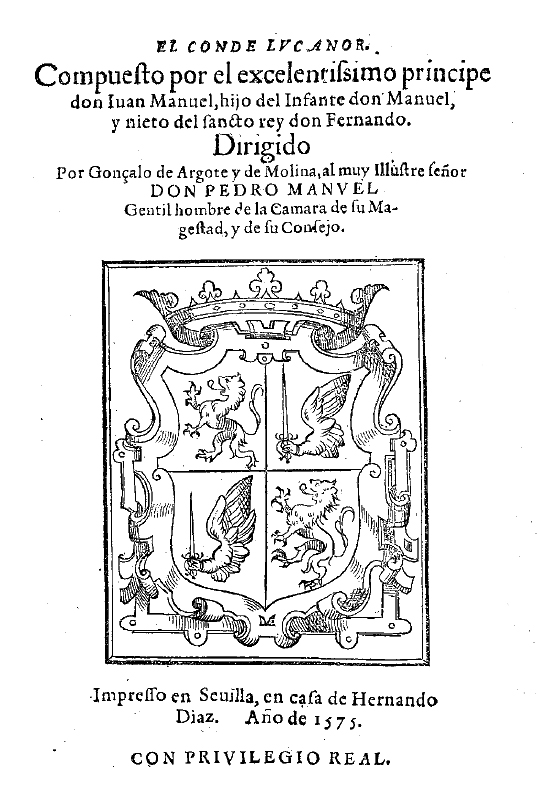
Title page of the 1575 printing

Tales of Count Lucanor (Old Spanish: Libro de los enxiemplos del Conde Lucanor et de Patronio) is a collection of parables written in 1335 by Juan Manuel, Prince of Villena. It is one of the earliest works of prose in Castilian Spanish.

The book is divided into five parts. The first and best-known part is a series of 51 short stories (some no more than a page or two) drawn from various sources, such as Aesop and other classical writers, and Arabic folktales.

Tales of Count Lucanor was first printed in 1575 when it was published at Seville under the auspices of Argote de Molina. It was again printed at Madrid in 1642, after which it lay forgotten for nearly two centuries.

== Purpose and structure ==
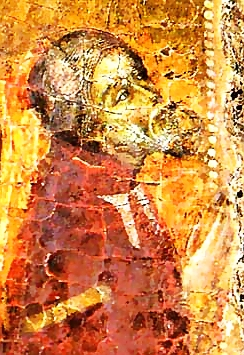
Don Juan Manuel, the author of Tales of Count Lucanor

The book exhibits a didactic, moralistic purpose, as would much Spanish literature that followed it. Count Lucanor engages in conversation with his advisor Patronio, putting to him a problem ("Some man has made me a proposition..." or "I fear that such and such person intends to...") and asking for advice. Patronio responds always with the greatest humility, claiming not to wish to offer advice to so illustrious a person as the Count, but offering to tell him a story of which the Count's problem reminds him. (Thus, the stories are "examples" [ejemplos] of wise action.) At the end he advises the Count to do as the protagonist of his story did.

Each chapter ends in more or less the same way, with slight variations on: "And this pleased the Count greatly and he did just so, and found it well. And Don Johán (Juan) saw that this example was very good, and had it written in this book, and composed the following verses." A rhymed couplet closes, giving the moral of the story.

== Origin of stories and influence on later literature ==
Many of the stories written in the book are the first examples written in a modern European language of various stories, which many other writers would use in the succeeding centuries. Many of the stories he included were themselves derived from other stories, coming from western and Arab sources.

Shakespeare's The Taming of the Shrew has the basic elements of Tale 35, "What Happened to a Young Man Who Married a Strong and Ill-tempered Woman". (Note: Exemplo XXXVº - De lo que contesçió a un mançebo que casó con una muger muy fuerte et muy brava. See James York's translation in English)

Tale 32, "What Happened to the King and the Tricksters Who Made Cloth" (Note: Exemplo XXXIIº - De lo que contesció a un rey con los burladores que fizieron el paño. See James York's translation in English) tells the story that Hans Christian Andersen made popular as The Emperor's New Clothes.

Story 7, "What Happened to a Woman Named Truhana", a version of Aesop's The Milkmaid and Her Pail, was claimed by Max Müller to originate in the Hindu cycle Panchatantra.

Tale 2, "What happened to a good Man and his Son, leading a beast to market," is the familiar fable The miller, his son and the donkey.

Tale 11, "What Happened to a Dean of Santiago de Compostela and Don Yllán, the Grand Master of Toledo", is the source for a short story by Jorge Luis Borges titled "El brujo postergado" [A Wizard Postponed], included in his book Historia universal de la infamia [A Universal History of Infamy] (1935), which is a reelaboration of the original story.

== The stories ==
The book opens with a prologue which introduces the characters of the Count and Patronio. The titles in the following list are those given in Keller and Keating's 1977 translation into English. James York's 1868 translation into English gives a significantly different ordering of the stories and omits the fifty-first.

1. What Happened to a King and His Favorite
2. What Happened to a Good Man and His Son
3. How King Richard of England Leapt into the Sea Against the Moors
4. What a Genoese Said to His Soul When He Was about to Die
5. What Happened to a Fox and a Crow Who Had a Piece of Cheese in His Beak
6. How the Swallow Warned the Other Birds When She Saw Flax Being Sown
7. What Happened to a Woman Named Truhana
8. What Happened to a Man Whose Liver Had to Be Washed
9. What Happened to Two Horses Which Were Thrown to the Lion
10. What Happened to a Man Who on Account of Poverty and Lack of Other Food Was Eating Bitter Lentils
11. What Happened to a Dean of Santiago de Compostela and Don Yllán, the Grand Master of Toledo
12. What Happened to the Fox and the Rooster
13. What Happened to a Man Who Was Hunting Partridges
14. The Miracle of Saint Dominick When He Preached Against the Usurer
15. What Happened to Lorenzo Suárez at the Siege of Seville
16. The Reply that Count Fernán González Gave to His Relative Núño Laynes
17. What Happened to a Very Hungry Man Who Was Half-heartedly Invited to Dinner
18. What Happened to Pero Meléndez de Valdés When He Broke His Leg
19. What Happened to the Crows and the Owls
20. What Happened to a King for Whom a Man Promised to Perform Alchemy
21. What Happened to a Young King and a Philosopher to Whom His Father Commended Him
22. What Happened to the Lion and the Bull
23. How the Ants Provide For Themselves
24. What Happened to the King Who Wanted to Test His Three Sons
25. What Happened to the Count of Provence and How He Was Freed from Prison by the Advice of Saladin
26. What Happened to the Tree of Lies
27. What Happened to an Emperor and to Don Alvarfáñez Minaya and Their Wives
28. What Happened in Granada to Don Lorenzo Suárez Gallinato When He Beheaded the Renegade Chaplain
29. What Happened to a Fox Who Lay down in the Street to Play Dead
30. What Happened to King Abenabet of Seville and Ramayquía His Wife
31. How a Cardinal Judged Between the Canons of Paris and the Friars Minor
32. What Happened to the King and the Tricksters Who Made Cloth
33. What Happened to Don Juan Manuel's Saker Falcon and an Eagle and a Heron
34. What Happened to a Blind Man Who Was Leading Another
35. What Happened to a Young Man Who Married a Strong and Ill-tempered Woman
36. What Happened to a Merchant When He Found His Son and His Wife Sleeping Together
37. What Happened to Count Fernán González with His Men after He Had Won the Battle of Hacinas
38. What Happened to a Man Who Was Loaded Down with Precious Stones and Drowned in the River
39. What Happened to a Man and a Swallow and a Sparrow
40. Why the Seneschal of Carcassonne Lost His Soul
41. What Happened to a King of Córdova Named Al-Haquem
42. What Happened to a Woman of Sham Piety
43. What Happened to Good and Evil and the Wise Man and the Madman
44. What Happened to Don Pero Núñez the Loyal, to Don Ruy González de Zavallos, and to Don Gutier Roiz de Blaguiello with Don Rodrigo the Generous
45. What Happened to a Man Who Became the Devil's Friend and Vassal
46. What Happened to a Philosopher Who by Accident Went Down a Street Where Prostitutes Lived
47. What Befell a Moor and His Sister Who Pretended That She Was Timid
48. What Happened to a Man Who Tested His Friends
49. What Happened to the Man Whom They Cast out Naked on an Island When They Took away from Him the Kingdom He Ruled
50. What Happened to Saladin and a Lady, the Wife of a Knight Who Was His Vassal
51. What Happened to a Christian King Who Was Very Powerful and Haughty

== Latter parts ==
Juan Manuel's format was evidently unsatisfying to his patron, James III of Jérica. In the latter sections of the book, he abandoned the parable device and tried to find a balance between brevity and substance acceptable to James. Parts 2 and 3 are collections of 150 succinct proverbs. In part 4, Lucano complains that the proverbs are too obscure, and Patronio responds with several direct lessons. The fifth and final part is a discourse, occasionally incorporating parables, on the importance of good works for salvation.

== In popular culture ==
The book is being read by Madrid schoolchildren in Rebecca Pawel's novel Death of a Nationalist (2003).

In 2016, Baroque Decay released a game under the name The Count Lucanor. As well as some protagonists' names, certain events from the books inspired past events in the game.
