= Horizon High School =

Horizon High School may refer to:

- Horizon High School (Thornton, Colorado)
- Horizon High School (Scottsdale, Arizona)
- Horizon High School (Horizon City, Texas)
- Horizon High School (Pleasanton, California)
- Horizon High School (Winter Garden, Florida)
- Horizon High School (Shawnee Mission, Kansas)
- Horizon Junior/Senior High School (Evanston, Wyoming)
- Keith Lutz Horizon High School (Omaha, Nebraska)
- Ormiston Horizon Academy (Stoke-on-Trent, Staffordshire)

== See also ==
- Horizon (disambiguation)
