= Horizons (ballet) =

Horizons was a modern dance work choreographed by Martha Graham to music by Louis Horst with a set designed by Alexander Calder. It premiered on February 23, 1936, at the Guild Theatre in New York City. Horizons was divided into four parts, two ensemble dances and two solos: Migration: New Trails (ensemble), Dominion: Sanctified Power (solo), Building Motif: Homesteading (solo) and Dance of Rejoycing (ensemble). The ballet was performed by Martha Graham and Group, the predecessor of the Martha Graham Dance Company.

== Theme, score and set ==
The work was based on the theme of exploration and discovery. Program notes explained, the inspiration was "not specifically American, but abstracted from the American background." According to the Dance Observer, Horizons was "evidently based on the concept of the first migrations from Asia, west to the American continent, settlement and thanksgiving."

Graham's receipt of a Guggenheim Fellowship, allowed her to commission composer Louis Horst for the music. However, Horst was unhappy with the score from the beginning.

Experimental and innovative, Calder's kinetic set consisted of a collection of swaying and revolving mobiles. The vari-colored disks, balls, spirals and pear-shaped forms were attached to poles set at different heights against white and red backdrops.

== Critical reception ==
More than one reviewer saw the work as a new direction for Graham. The choreography was depicted as "oriental, still, contemplative, restrained." The dancing described as possessing a "new sentient warmth," especially in Building Motif, which the critic called a softer, gentler version of the solo Frontier. The Springfield Union's reviewer agreed, writing that Horizons marked a milestone in Graham's artistic evolution, as she transitioned from the abstract to work with "utilitarian or social content."

In general, though, Horizons was not very well received. It was called "stylized to the point of obfuscation of content and irksome monotony of movement," "too long" and "unnecessarily repetitious," as well as "forced and lacking in spontaneity." Louis Horst quoted one critic as saying, "Horizons was a poor dance and a poor music score." Horst himself later added, "It was kind of a failure.

The harshest criticism was reserved for Calder's set. The New York Telegraph's reviewer ridiculed it as "a series of floating balloons, ropes wriggling like sleepy snakes, and something that resembled a huge turnip...turning in the changing light." The New York Times dance critic John Martin described it as "representing Miss Graham at her most abstract," adding that the mobiles "were greeted by a series of cheers, boos and hisses."

The New York Post reporter cheered the audience response and mocked the use of mobiles to "enlarge the sense of the horizon...a monstrous corkscrew rotating sullenly in a frustrated attempt to prick a coy blue balloon which turned squeakily against a red background. You can see how this would enlarge your sense of horizon."
