= Horizons: Software Starter Pack =

Software compilation

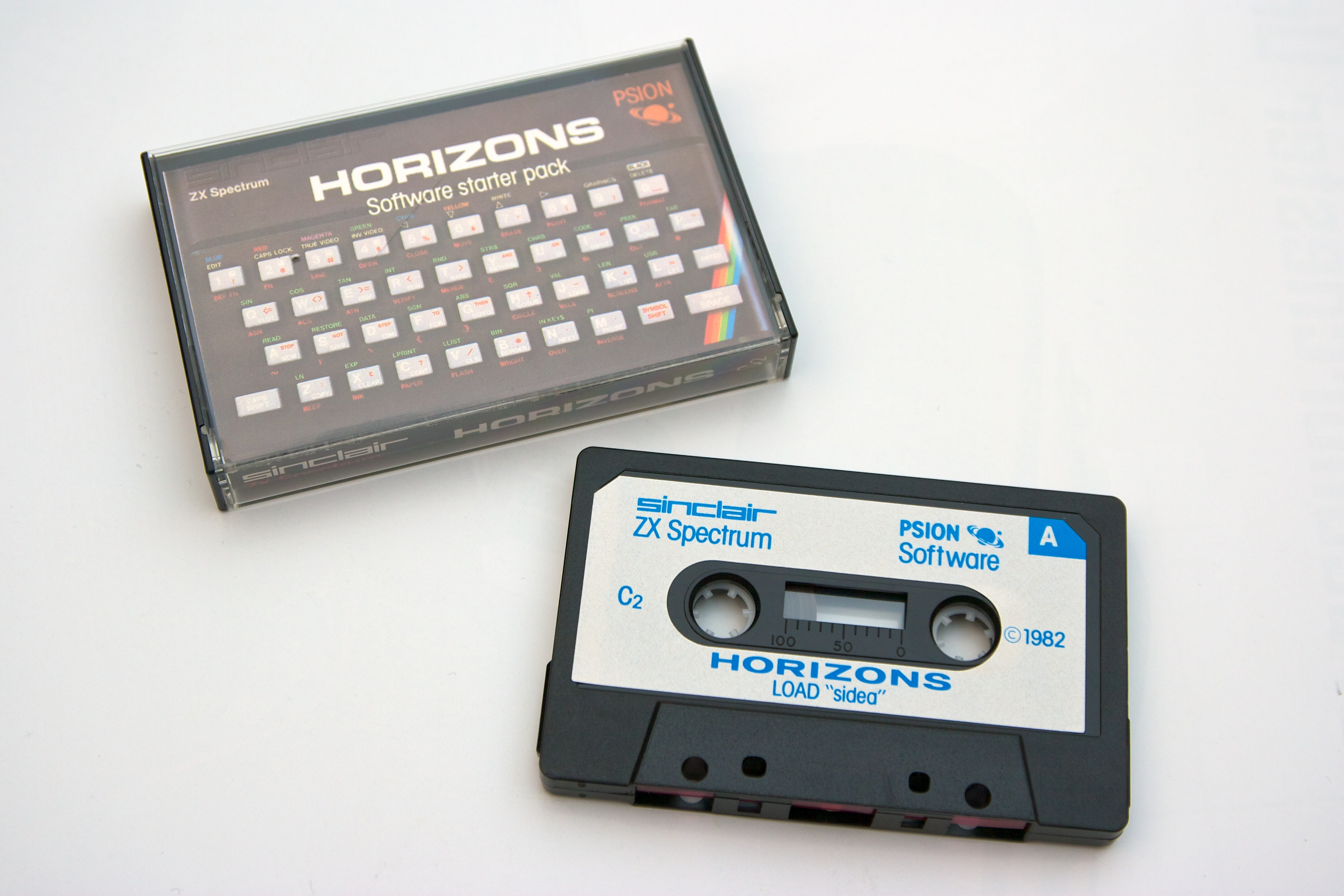
Horizons: Software Starter Pack cassette

Horizons: Software Starter Pack is a software compilation for the ZX Spectrum, designed by Psion Software Ltd and published by Sinclair Research Ltd in 1982.

It was not released on its own, but came bundled with new ZX Spectrums. Side A of the cassette tape contains lessons and tutorials pertaining to the Spectrum and Side B contains eight programs written in BASIC. It was considered a good companion to the Spectrum manual.

== Side A contents ==
Side A contains six separately-loading tutorials. The first is an overview of the Spectrum hardware. Programmes 2 to 5 are specific computing lessons. The final programme is a glossary of ZX Spectrum BASIC keywords.

== Side B contents ==
Side B contains eight programmes written in BASIC.

1. Thro' the Wall is a Breakout clone which, while basic, was described as very addictive.
2. Bubblesort is an implementation of the bubble sort sorting algorithm.
3. Evolution is a mathematical model of a simplified ecosystem of foxes and rabbits using the Lotka–Volterra equations. The logic was that too small a population of rabbits would provide insufficient food for foxes whose numbers would then decline, until too few foxes would result in the rabbit population again increasing, and the cycle would continue. One nominated a number of rabbits and number of foxes to start, then watched the basic graph of the two populations rising and falling. At any point in time, one could pause the simulation and save to the audio cassette by pressing 'Record' on the connected remote tape recorder, then later resume the simulation on the Spectrum from that point.
4. Life is an implementation of Conway's Game of Life.
5. Draw is a basic object-based drawing utility.
6. Monte Carlo is a simulation of the repeated rolling of two dice which graphs the expected and observed probability distribution.
7. Character Generator is a utility for editing the ZX Spectrum UDGs (user defined graphics).
8. Beating of Waves plots the sum of two sine waves.
