= New Horizons (disambiguation) =

New Horizons is a U.S. spacecraft which made a historic flyby of Pluto in July 2015.

New Horizons may also refer to:

== Boats ==
- New Horizons 26, a 1958 American sailboat design by Sparkman & Stephens

== Education ==
- New Horizons Governor's School for Science and Technology, a magnet school for southeastern Virginia students

== Film and television ==
- New Concorde, a film distribution and product company formerly known as Concorde-New Horizons
- New Horizons Film Festival, a film festival in Wrocław, Poland
- ROH New Horizons, a 2008 US professional wrestling pay-per-view event by Ring of Honor
- The Orville: New Horizons, season 3 of the U.S. TV show The Orville

== Government, politics and military ==
- New Horizons (Cyprus), a defunct political party in Cyprus
- Operation New Horizons or Beyond the Horizons, a set of US military operations

== Music ==
=== Albums ===
- New Horizons (Flyleaf album) (2012)
- New Horizons (Charles McPherson album) (1978)
- New Horizons (Connie Smith album) (1978)
- New Horizons (Sounds of Liberation album) (1972)
- New Horizons (The Sylvers album) (1977)
- New Horizons (Dottie West album) (1983)

=== Songs ===
- "New Horizons", by Sun Ra and his Myth Science Arkestra from We Travel the Space Ways, 1967
- "New Horizons", by the Moody Blues from Seventh Sojourn, 1972
- "New Horizons", the theme song for the Disney attraction Horizons
- "New Horizons", Channel 9 Australia's cricket theme written by Brian Bennett

== Video games ==
- Animal Crossing: New Horizons, a 2020 video game released by Nintendo
- Uncharted Waters: New Horizons, a 1993 video game released by Koei

== Other media ==
- New Horizons (art movement) (Ofakim Hadashim), an Israeli art movement
- New Horizons (book), a science-fiction anthology edited by August Derleth
- New Horizons (Eckland), a sculpture by Don Eckland on the University of Oregon campus, Eugene, Oregon, U.S.
- New Horizons, UK title of Découvertes Gallimard, an encyclopaedic series of illustrated, pocket-sized books

== See also ==
- New Horizon (disambiguation)
