= The Milkmaid of Tsarskoye Selo =

Fountain in St. Petersburg, Russia

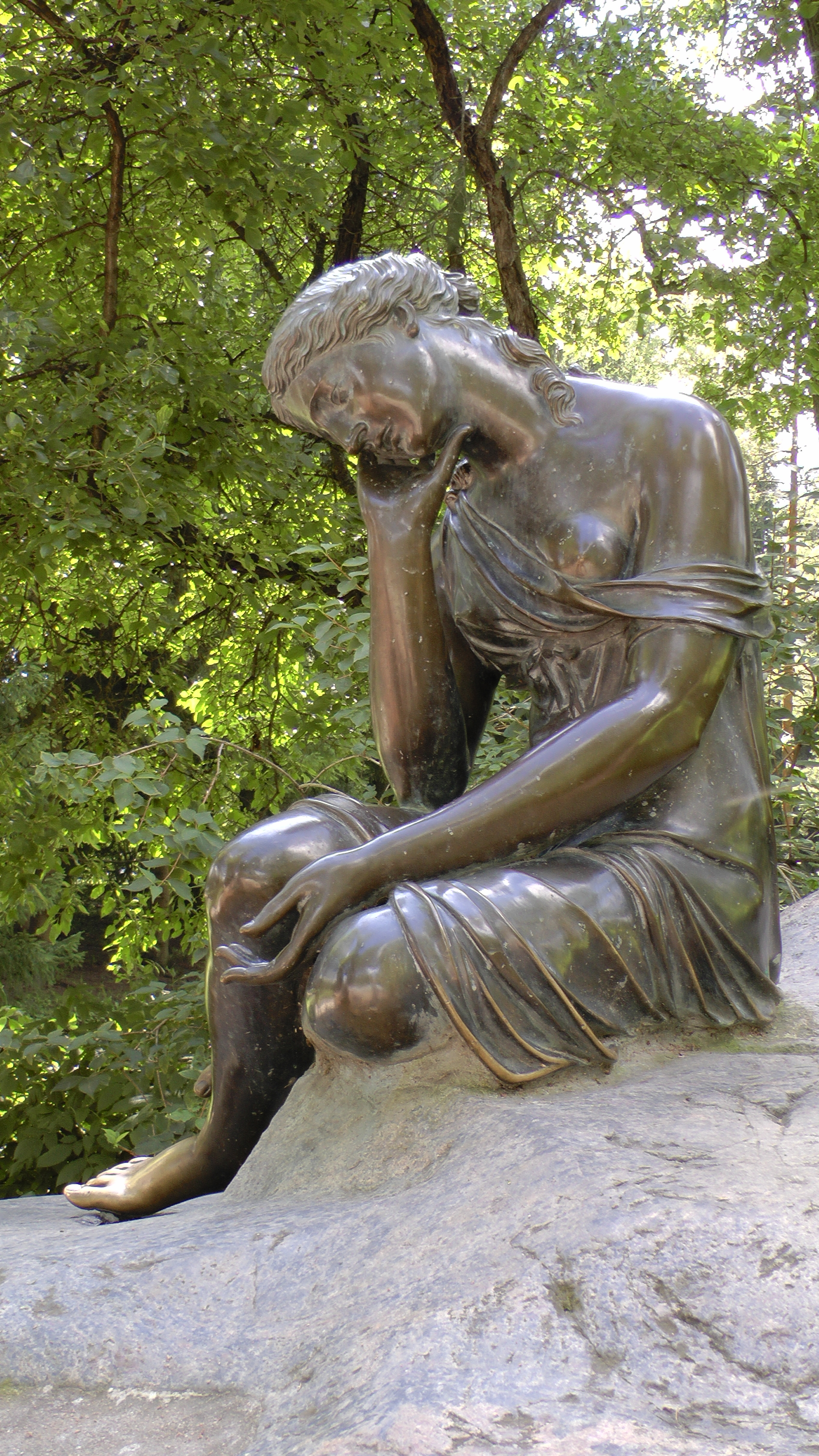
- Pavel Sokolov. Milkmaid or Girl with a pitcher. Catherine Park
- Interactive map of The Milkmaid of Tsarskoye Selo
- Location: Catherine Park, Tsarskoye Selo, Saint Petersburg, Russia
- Designer: Pavel Sokolov
- Type: Fountain
- Material: Bronze
- Beginning date: 1808
- Completion date: 1816

The Milkmaid of Tsarskoye Selo (also known as Girl with a pitcher) (Russian: Девушка с кувшином; other names: Milkwoman, Tsarskoye Selo Statue, Peretta) is a fountain in the Catherine Park of Tsarskoye Selo in St. Petersburg (designed by Augustin Betancourt, sculpted by Pavel Sokolov). It is a monument of garden and park architecture and sculpture from the early 19th century, of both federal and international importance. (Note: It is on the UNESCO list as a part of the museum-reserve, object 540-006 (Palace and park ensembles of the city of Pushkin).) It became known as Tsarskoye Selo Statue. The sculpture has become a poetic symbol of the Tsarskoye Selo gardens. According to Vsevolod Petrov, senior researcher of the Painting Department of the Russian Museum, the sculpture represents the pinnacle of Pavel Sokolov's work and is among the most beautiful achievements of Russian garden sculpture.

Contemporaries assumed that the source of the plot for the sculpture was La Fontaine's fable The Milkmaid, or the Jug of Milk. Some researchers see in the sculpture a portrait of the wife of Emperor Alexander I, Elizabeth Alexeevna, and believe that the fountain is an allegory of her mourning for her daughters who died in infancy and her lover who died shortly before. The fountain inspired a large number of Russian cultural figures to create literary and musical works. Among them are the poems Tsarskoye Selo Statue by Alexander Pushkin and Anna Akhmatova, and the romance The Pushkin's Statue of Tsarskoye Selo by Caesar Cui.

== The history of creation ==
Originally, there was a spring in this place, which served as the source of the Wangazi brook. During the reign of Catherine I, a staircase made of Pudost stone led to it. An arch was built over a wooden channel, through which the water flowed, supported by columns made of the same stone. Victor Semyonov, an employee of the Tsarskoye Selo Museum, recreated the spring in a sketch-reconstruction as it looked at that time. In 1757, after the construction of the Rolling Hill nearby, the spring was hidden in a special chamber, from which water flowed to the pond through an underground conduit — a trough paved with cobblestones, with wooden walls and an overlap. A dam was built at the outlet of the conduit to the surface. A wide and long cobblestone canal led from it, serving as the only source of drinking water for laborers and horses at that time.

By 1809, in Tsarskoye Selo, the Taitsky water pipeline was already operating, supplying large quantities of water from the Izhora Plateau, so the utilitarian function of the spring disappeared. (Note: Vladimir Pavlov, Betancourt's biographer, dated the realisation of the project for the reconstruction of the Taitsky waterway to a later period, 1812-1814, and the creation of the project for the construction of the waterway to 1774.) Between 1808 and 1810, during the improvement of the site of the former Rolling Hill, the garden master Johann Busch and architect Luigi Rusca transformed the slope between the Granite Terrace they created and the Big Pond into green ledges with paths down them.

The engineer Augustin Betancourt was tasked with “decorating this space by the terrace where the key water is located”. His investigations revealed the presence of a limestone aquifer underground. The water-retaining layer was Cambrian clay beneath the limestone at a depth of 3–4 meters. The area's topography, with its downward slope to the Great Pond, explains why the spring remains active. Betancourt reconstructed the existing chamber protecting the spring, transforming it from a protection chamber into a dripping chamber by extending and cutting into the aquifer up to the water table. The chamber was constructed as a double-roofed spruce log cabin, covered with clay on three sides. Betancourt positioned it directly on the aquifer, placing the water line between the chamber and the canal in a cast iron pipe. The height difference of two meters between the chamber and the canal was sufficient to create a fountain.

The sculpture for the fountain was created by Pavel Sokolov, a representative of Russian classicism and an academician of the Imperial Academy of Arts. Betancourt's biographer, Professor Vladimir Pavlov, wrote that it was the sculptor who approached the Spanish engineer with a proposal to design the future fountain. According to Pavlov, Betancourt was responsible for the water supply and drainage, the installation of the pedestal and the stone descent to the base, as well as the selection of the location for the sculpture. The model for the sculpture was made of alabaster. The stone used as a pedestal was placed over the pipe that carried water from the dripping chamber to the canal. The stone itself was drilled, allowing water from the pipe to flow into the broken urn once the end of the pipe below the hole was plugged.

The fountain was launched in 1810 to coincide with the centenary of Tsarskoye Selo, but Sokolov did not have time to convert the sculpture into bronze by that date. On June 16, 1816, the caretaker of the Taitsky Waterworks of the Tsarskoye Selo Palace Board, Lieutenant Engineer Francis Canobbio, sent a letter mentioning a change in the fountain's appearance: “The newly built cascade with an alabaster figure in the upper Tsarskoye Selo garden is now in perfect order and is completely finished”. Semyonov interpreted this message as evidence of the installation of the bronze figure replacing the alabaster one, noting that in August of the same year, the sculptor was paid 3,000 rubles. From the same period, there is a record by Sokolov mentioning some “work on behalf of His Majesty”. According to other sources, the bronze sculpture appeared only in 1817. (Note: Dmitry Kuznetsov, Betancourt's biographer, dated the casting of the sculpture in bronze to 1810, although he immediately noted that it was installed in Catherine Park in 1816.) It is known that the bronze statue was cast in the workshop of the Imperial Academy of Arts. The author's gypsum model of the statue is currently held in the State Russian Museum. Lyudmila Doronina, in her two-volume history of Russian sculpture, wrote that Betancourt was delighted by Pavel Sokolov's sculpture. Especially for the Spanish engineer (and at his request), the sculptor created a marble copy.

Originally, the architectural composition of the fountain created by Betancourt included a grotto, which was removed in the mid-19th century.

== Exterior of the fountain and surrounding landscape ==
A barefoot girl in an antique tunic sits on a large gray stone, tucking her legs beneath her and lowering her left hand, which holds a shard of a broken jug. Her right hand supports her bowed head, with a strand of hair falling onto her neck. Her left shoulder and chest are bare. Next to the girl lies the broken jug, from which a continuous stream of spring water flows.

The chief gardener of the Tsarskoye Selo parks, Joseph Busch, integrated the fountain into the romantic landscape. The granite pedestal stands in an open space surrounded by trees. According to Semyonov, they create “an astonishing feeling of something majestic and at the same time mysterious”.

== Fountain in 19th-21st centuries ==
In 1830, Ilya Yakovkin, professor emeritus and rector of the Imperial Kazan University, wrote a detailed description of the fountain, mentioning that in winter, the figure of the girl is covered with a “plank cover”. The author admired the authenticity with which the sculptor conveyed her “sorrow,” “inner brokenness,” and the accuracy of “the size of the whole figure”.

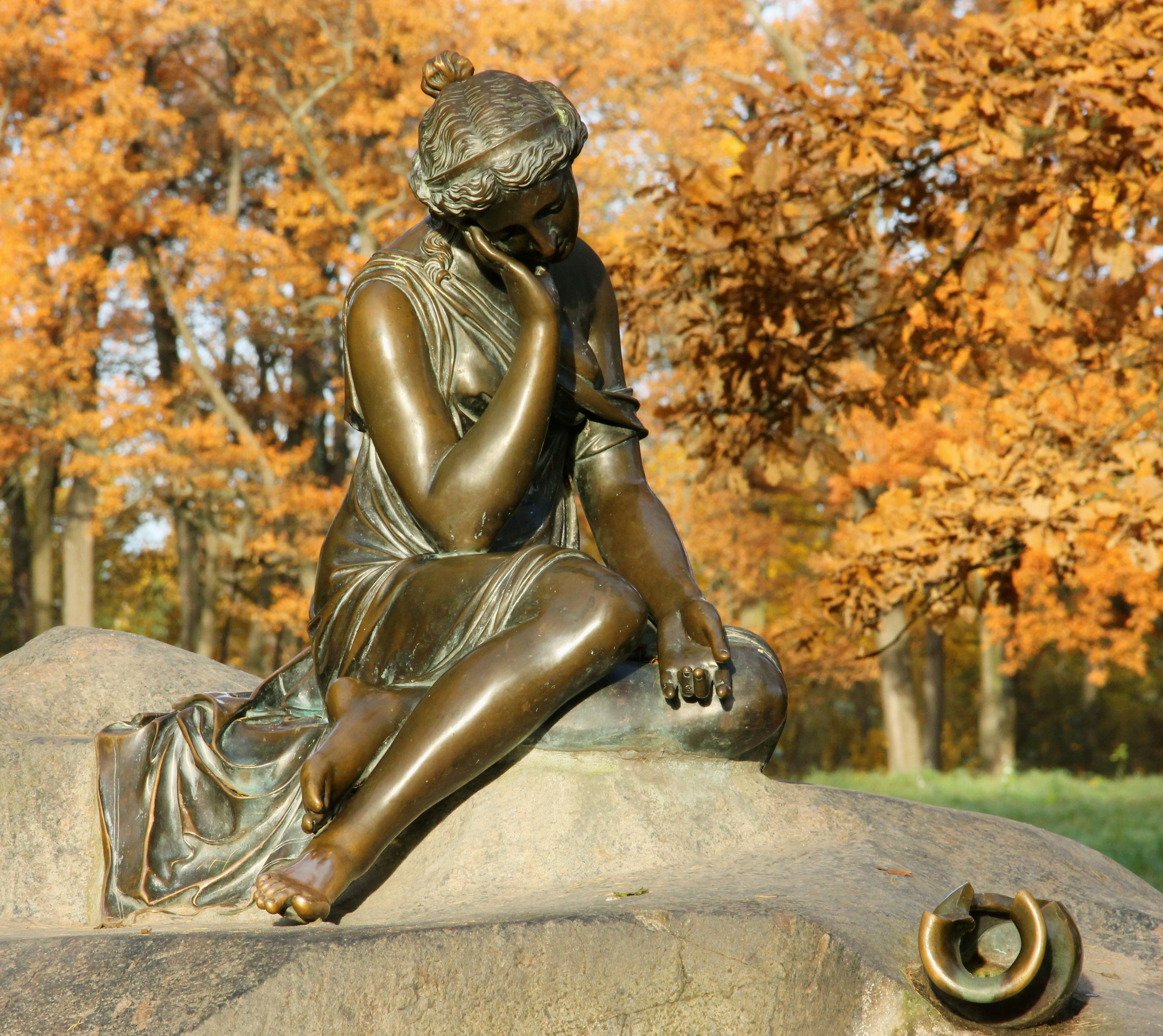
Milkmaid (Girl with a pitcher), 1816. Catherine Park in Tsarskoye Selo (autumn)

For a long time, the palace and park administration did not know the exact location from which the water flowed into the fountain. In 1877, when the jet from the jug began to disappear, it was discovered that there were no drawings of the water supply system. Special research work was entrusted to engineer Chernyavsky. He managed to identify and document the water supply system created by Betancourt. The system itself was deemed satisfactory, requiring only minor reconstruction: the rotten ceiling of the dripping chamber was replaced, the pipes were cleaned, and the clogging, which had caused difficulties with the water supply, was addressed. Semyonov suggested that it was around this time, due to the wide coverage of the repair work in the media, that a legend emerged claiming that the water from the fountain could cure bodily and cardiac ailments. The legend spread widely and even attracted the interest of specialists. A stone bollard was placed near the fountain, to which a mug was chained with an iron chain for the use of numerous pilgrims. Chemical analysis, conducted in 1910 by Dr. Gutovkin, revealed that the water from the fountain was of inferior quality compared to the tap water in Tsarskoye Selo, which came from the Orlovsky and Taitsky springs. It contained more bacteria and was harder.

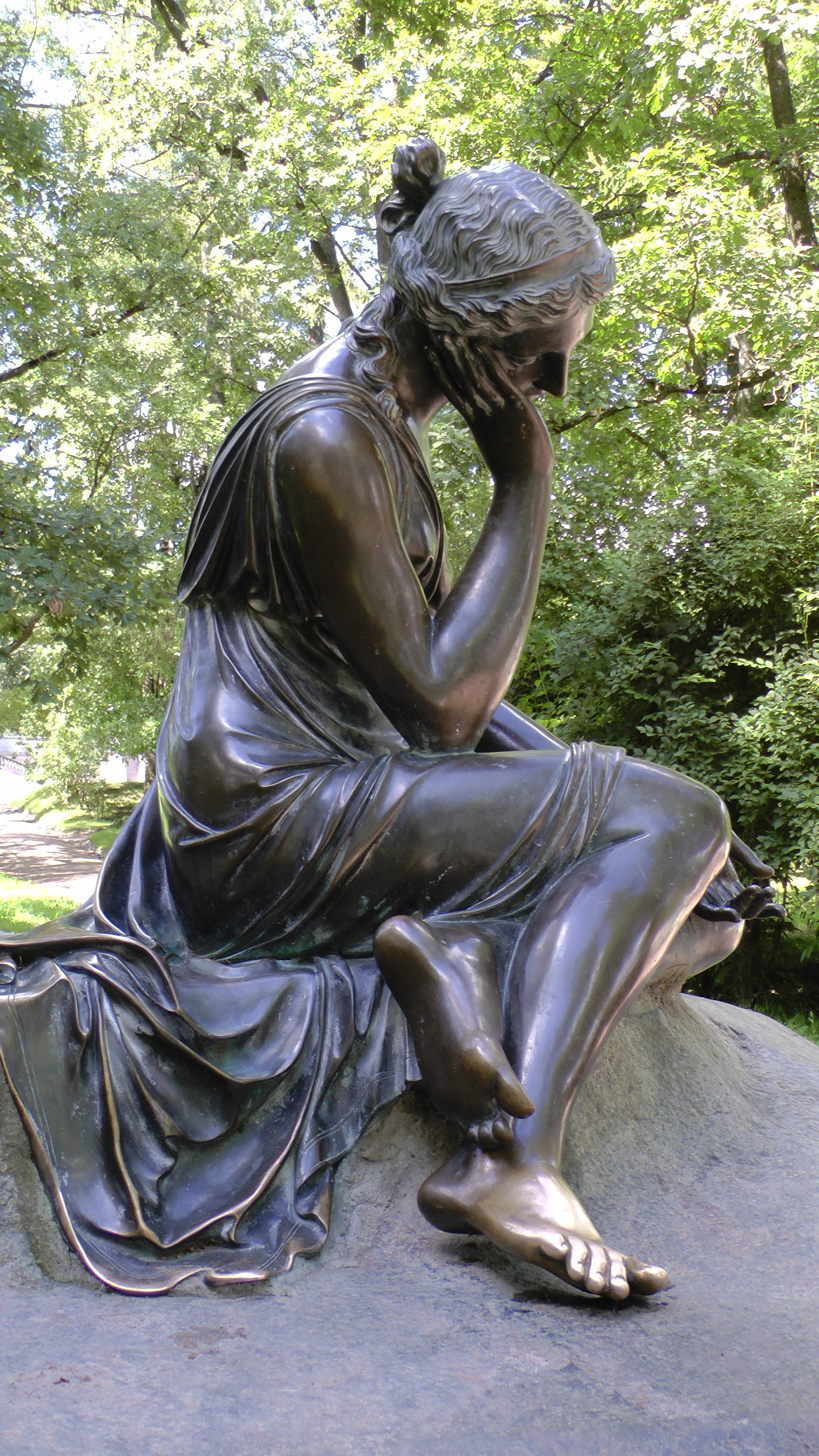
Milkmaid (Girl with a pitcher), 1816. Catherine Park in Tsarskoye Selo (summer)

At the end of the 19th century, a picket fence made of iron bars was built around the fountain, modeled after the wooden fencing used in parks at that time. The fence was planted with low greenery. In 1937, it was removed, and at the same time, the stone bollard that stood at the place where the water from the jug fell was also eliminated.

Before the German occupation during the World War II, the statue was buried and remained underground for three years, thus avoiding damage. Dmitry Kuznetsov found it symbolic that, near the place where the sculpture was buried, the headquarters of the 250th Blue Division of Spanish volunteers was located at the dacha of Countess Julia Samoilova on the Pavlovsky highway. After the city's liberation, the sculpture, dug out from its hiding place, was placed in the poet's room at the Tsarskoye Selo Lyceum (where it stood on an ordinary box draped with burlap), where a Pushkin corner was arranged. The broken vessel from the fountain, however, was lost. During the Great Patriotic War, the city's water supply system was destroyed, and the fountain, deprived of the sculpture, became the only source of drinking water for the residents of Tsarskoye Selo and its surroundings. In 1945, the sculpture was returned to its original location, and in 1947, the broken jug was recreated, from which water once again flowed. In 1951, the fountain was fully restored (and for some time after that, there was a fence around it).

In 1989, a new reconstruction of the fountain was carried out: the rotten timbers of the dripping chamber were replaced with reinforced concrete parts, cast iron pipes were replaced with plastic ones, and broken stones in the pavement were replaced with specially made stones according to the original drawings. A convenient water intake for tourists was also added in the granite wall. In 1990, a replica was created to replace the original bronze sculpture (see below).

In June 1992, the original Sokolov sculpture was displayed at the AmeriFlora-92 exhibition in Columbus, USA, dedicated to the 400th anniversary of Columbus's discovery of America. For this purpose, a special reservoir was dug, on the bank of which a large stone was placed. The statue with the jug was fixed on top, and the water was brought in.

== Original and copies ==
- Nowadays, the original statue is in the collections of the Tsarskoye Selo Museum-Reserve, while a copy, made in 1990 at the Monumentsculpture factory, stands in the park.
- Another copy, created in case of vandalism, is held in the Tsarskoye Selo collections.
- The author’s bronze copy of the sculpture is located at the Sukhanovo estate. Soviet and Russian scholar, theologian, and literary critic Mikhail Dunayev traced the fate of this copy of the fountain, created by Pavel Sokolov, at Sukhanovo near Moscow. According to Dunayev, it originally decorated, as in Tsarskoye Selo, a small spring in the park next to the pond. Later, it was moved to the mausoleum of the estate's masters, the Princes Volkonsky. Built in 1813, the mausoleum was seen by Dunayev as a masterpiece. He noted some minor damage to the Girl with a Jug, but generally considered it to be in satisfactory condition.
- The plaster cast of the sculpture is exhibited in the halls of the Russian Museum.
- A copy of the sculpture was presented by the wife of Emperor Nicholas I, Alexandra Feodorovna, to her brother, Prince Friedrich Karl Alexander of Prussia. It was installed in the Glinik Palace near Potsdam, but disappeared during the World War II. It has since been replaced by a copy made in the USSR.
- The 1989 copy was donated by representatives of the Soviet Union to the Britz Castle Association and is installed in Britz Park.
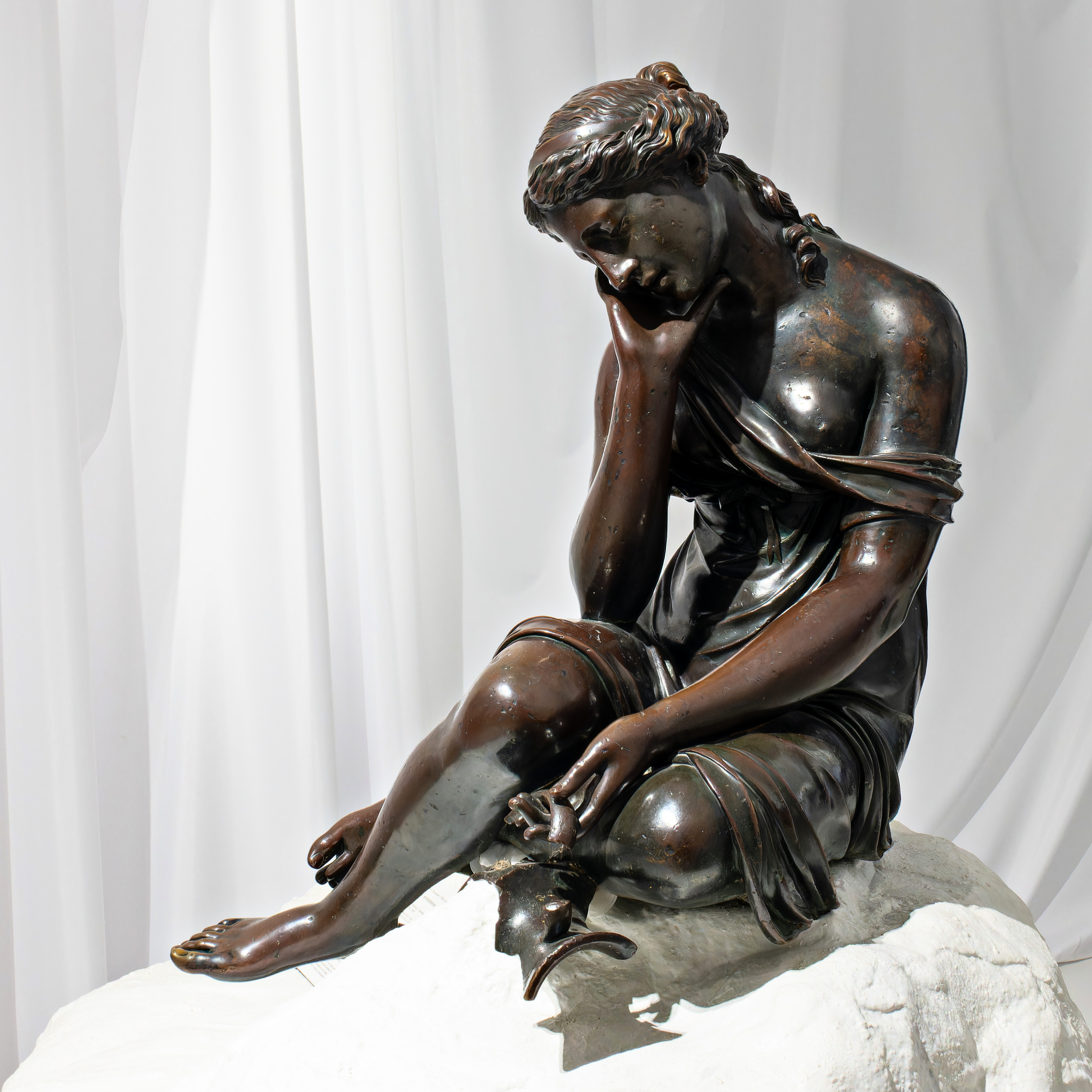
Original statue from the funds of the Tsarskoye Selo Museum-Reserve

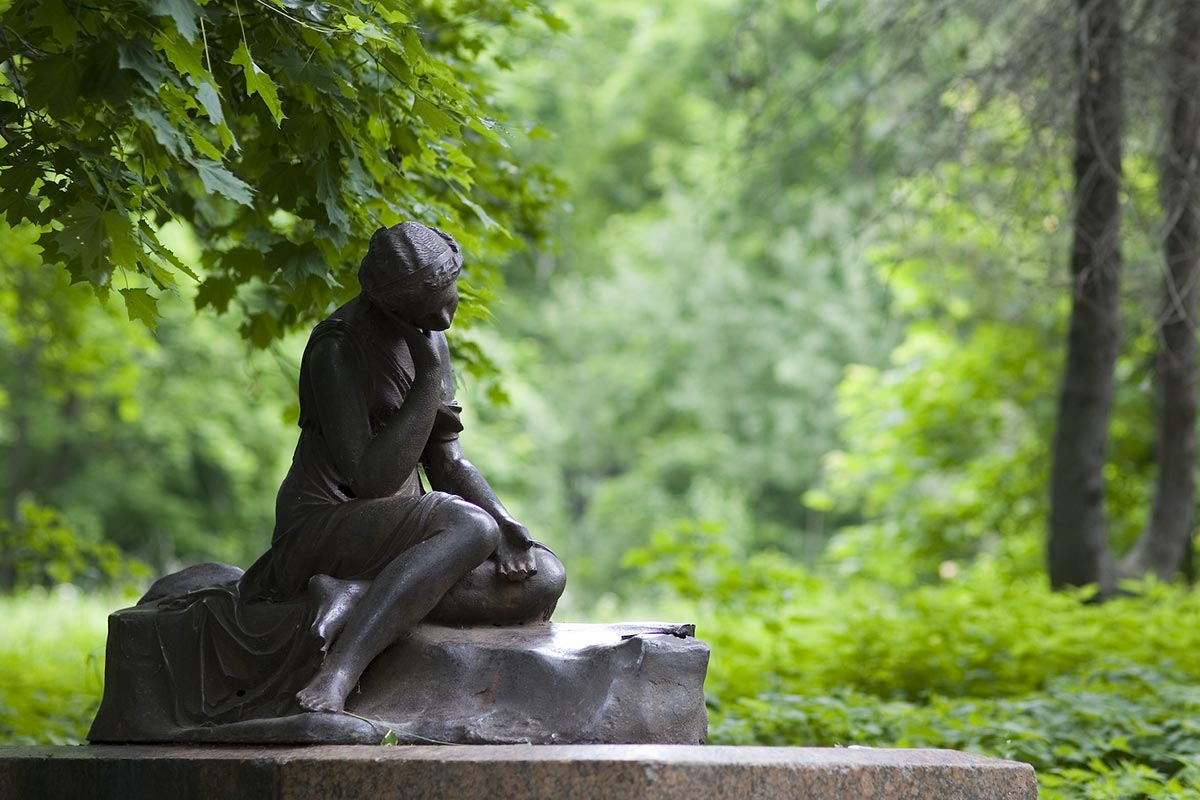
Milkmaid (Girl with a pitcher), 1816. A version from Sukhanovo

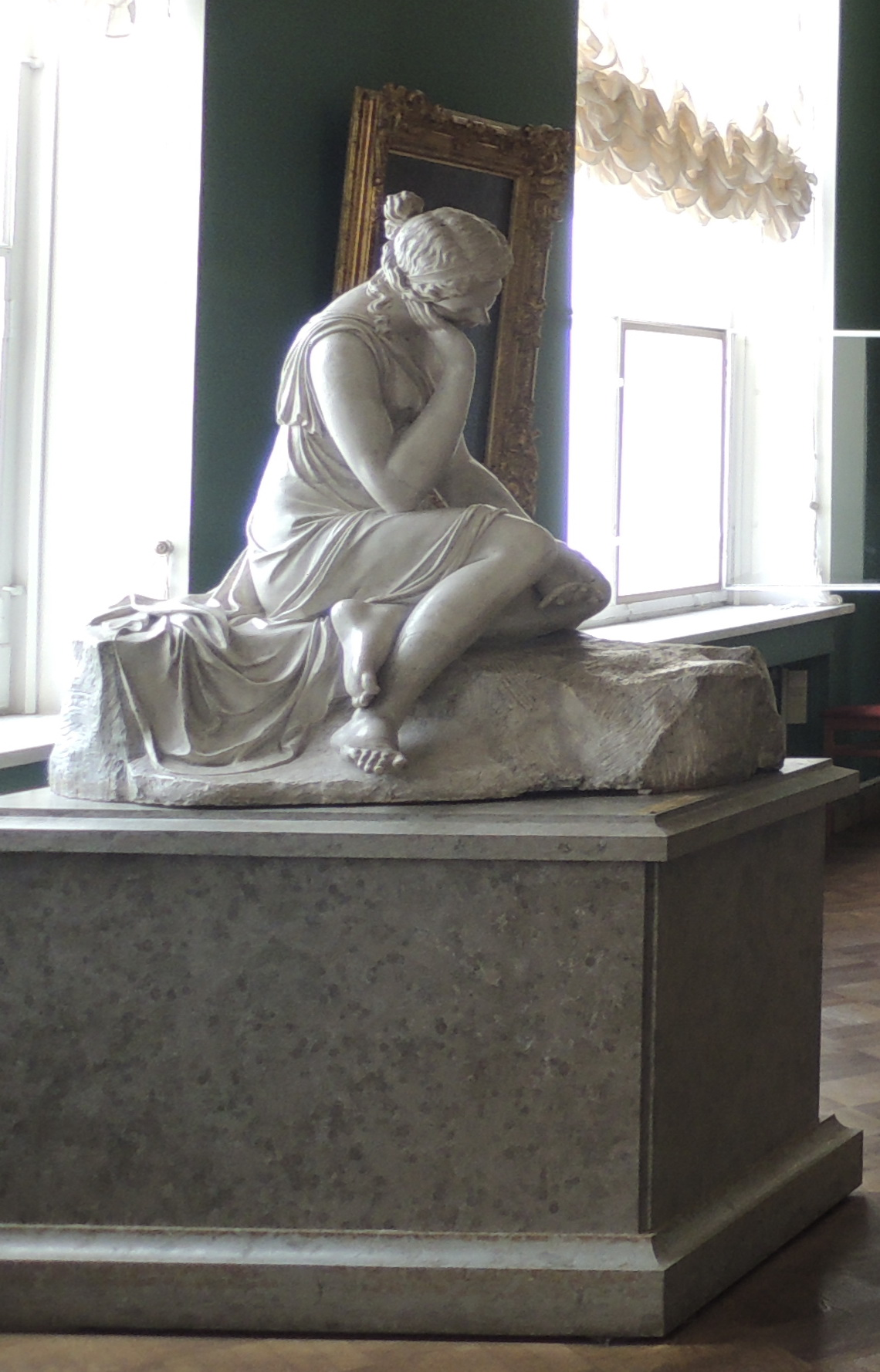
Statue's copy at the Russian Museum

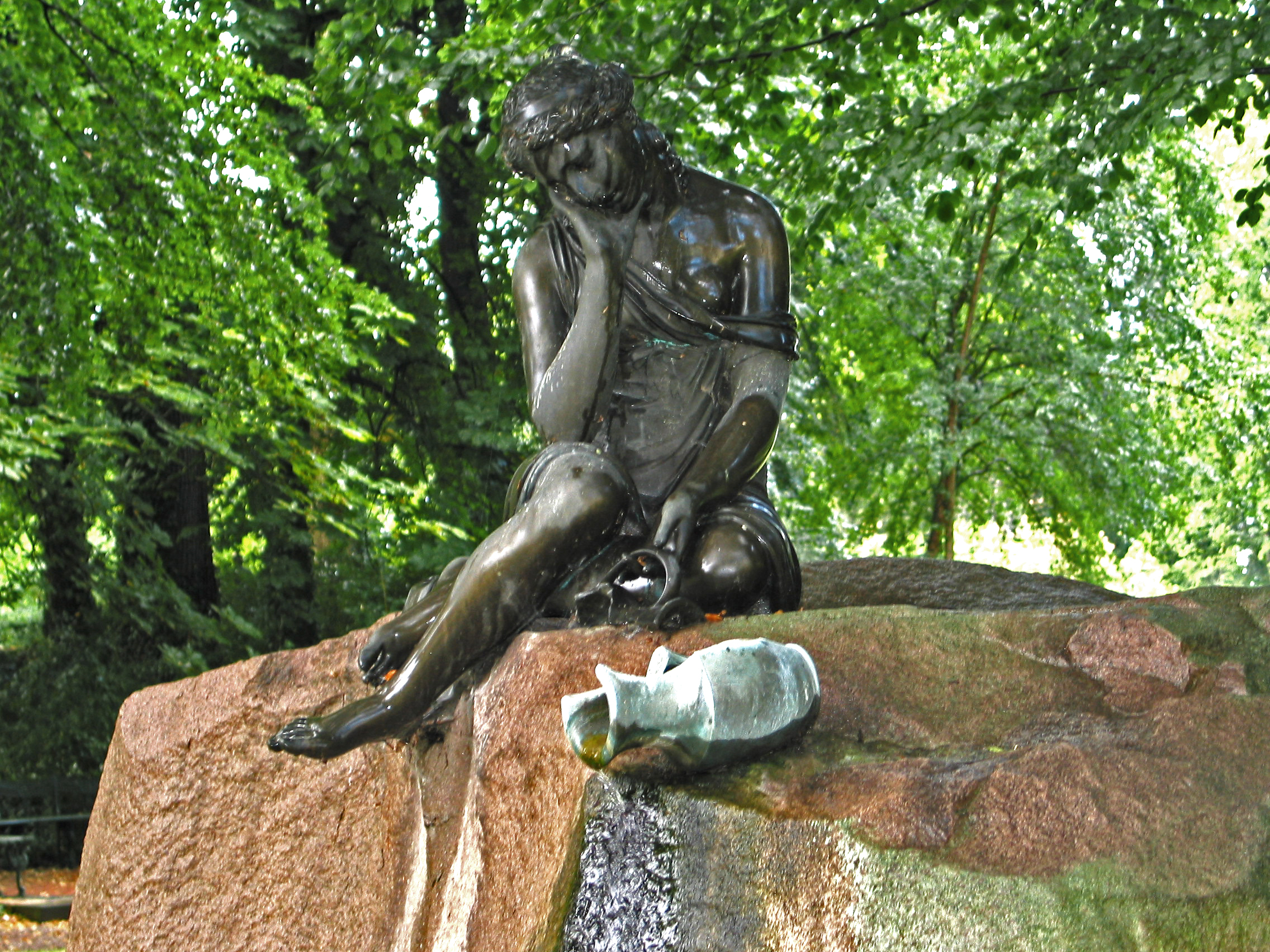
Statue's copy in Glinik

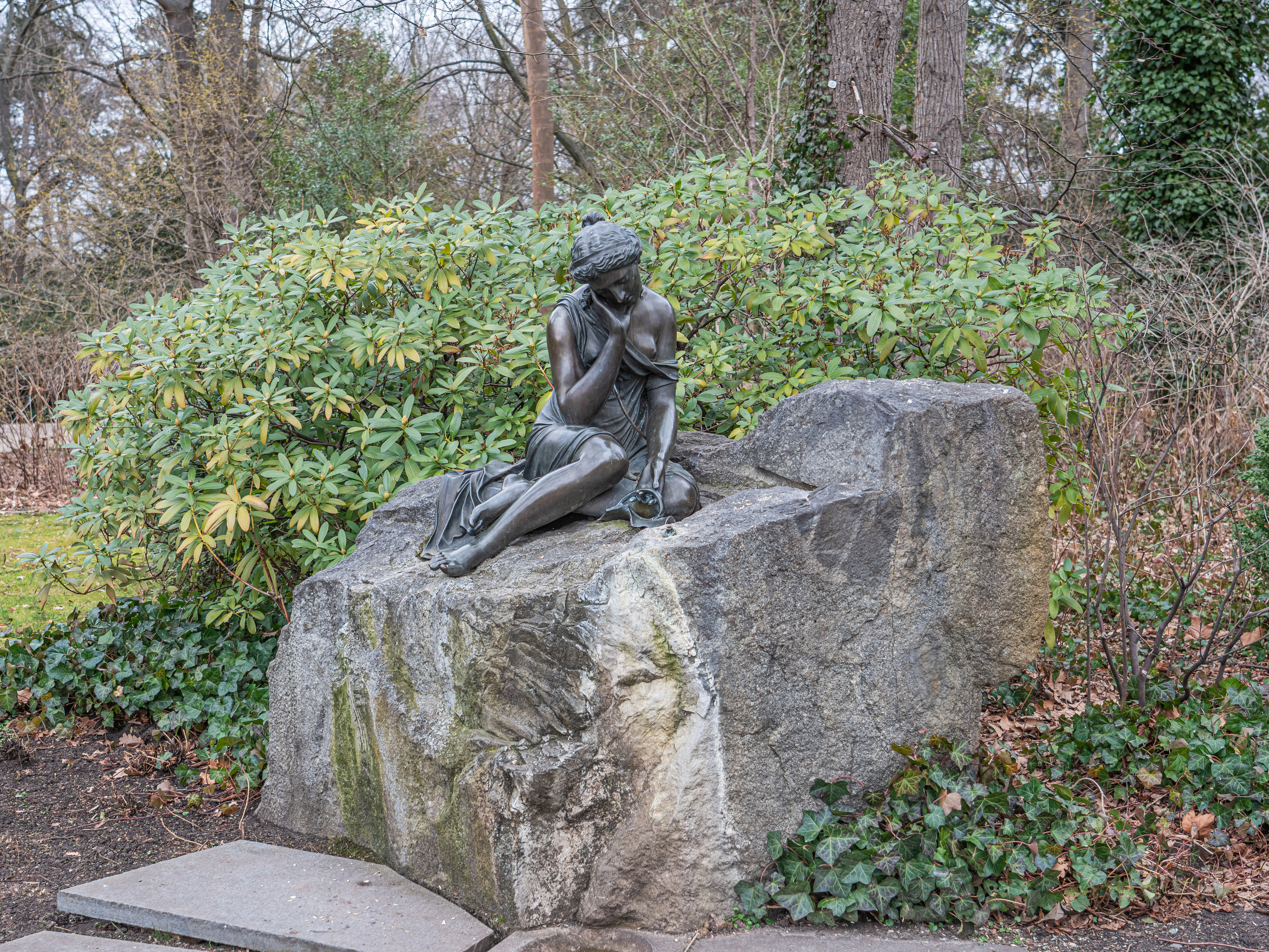
Modern statue's copy in Britz Park

== In the Russian art history ==
=== Hypotheses about the plot ===
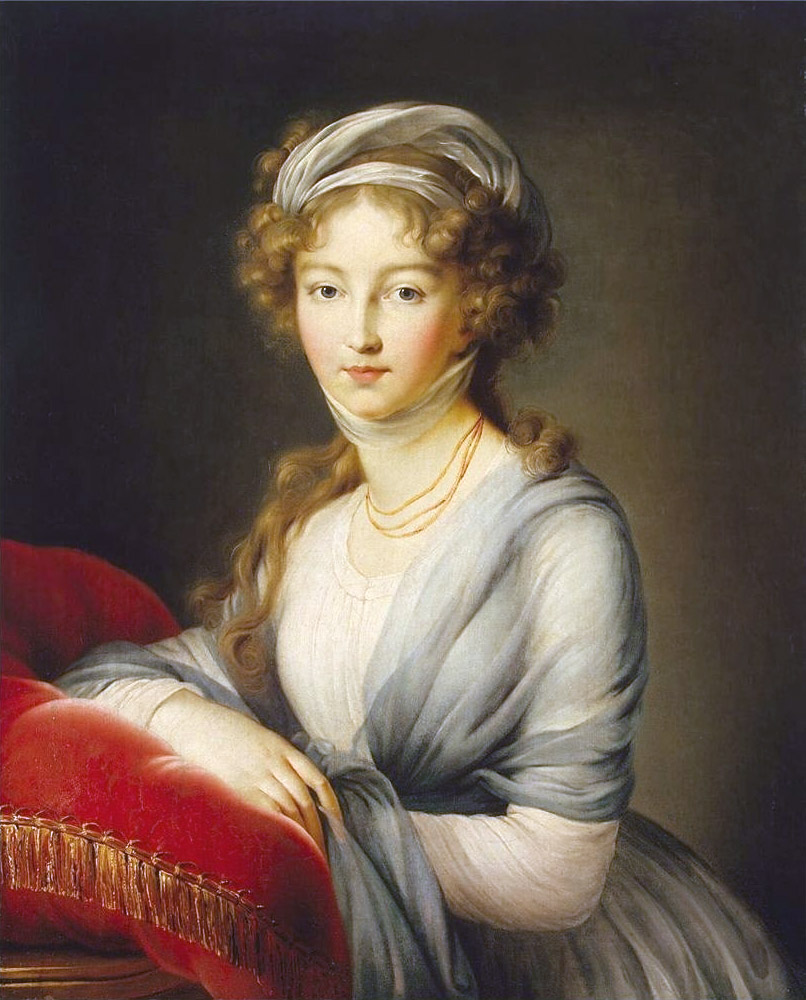
E. Vigée Le Brun. Empress Elizabeth Alexeevna, 1795

Contemporaries assumed that the source of the plot for the sculpture was La Fontaine's fable The Milkmaid, or a Jug of Milk. (Note: Even before La Fontaine, this story was the basis of a short story-parable by the 16th-century French writer Bonaventure des Periers.) Dmitry Kuznetsov, Ph.D., professor at SPbPU, referred to the French fable writer as the favorite poet of Alexander I and Augustin Betancourt. The plot of the fable is as follows: the milkmaid Perette hurries to the market, planning to buy chickens with the proceeds from the milk, and then, after selling them, to breed piglets. Afterward, she hopes to sell the piglets and buy calves. At this moment, she breaks a jug of milk. Sitting next to the broken jug, Perette regrets the dreams that never came true and tries to come up with an explanation for what happened for her husband. The writer, historian, and journalist Pavel Svinyin, who left the first direct account of the sculpture, wrote in 1817: “A beautiful peasant woman sits on granite in grief over her broken mug, from which flows the purest water in the neighborhood”. The famous local historian, publicist, and fiction writer Mikhail Pyliaev mentions only this version of the fountain's plot in his 1889 book The Forgotten Past of Petersburg's Suburbs. (Note: Before Sokolov, the French painter Jean-Honoré Fragonard painted Perrette and the Milk Pitcher (53 x 63 cm, oil on canvas, Musée Cognac-Jeu, Paris) around 1770. His painting interprets the events as a crude farce: the girl falls with the jug, her skirts are scuffed, and the dust that rises as she falls symbolises the vanishing of dreams. There is a version of the use of this plot in Jean-Baptiste Gréza's painting The Broken Jug (110 x 85 cm, canvas, oil, Louvre, Paris, 1772-1773), which depicts a girl with bare breasts, dressed in wrinkled clothes and carrying a broken jug in her hand. Some researchers have concluded that this painting has no connection with La Fontaine's fable and that it is an allegory of lost innocence. The authors of the historical and literary commentary on Pushkin's poem noted that Sokolov weakened the erotic character of the plot in comparison with the French artists.) In 1999, in an article in the journal Nauka i Religiya, Lyudmila Belozerova, a researcher of sculptor Pavel Sokolov's work and the author of the sculptural image, suggested that the model for the statue might have been the wife of Emperor Alexander I, Elizabeth Alexeevna. Later, this article was published in the collection The Angel of Tsar Alexander, released in 2008 in the series Christian Culture: Pushkin's Era. The secretary of the embassy of the Saxon Elector described the appearance of Elizabeth Alexeevna as follows:

"Her facial features are extremely fine and correct: Greek profile, large blue eyes, and the most beautiful blond hair. Her figure is graceful and majestic, and her gait is purely airy. In short, the Empress seems to be one of the most beautiful women in the world".

The statue resembled Elizabeth Alexeevna in both face and figure, but during Alexander's reign, this similarity was either not emphasized due to the sovereign's complicated relationship with his wife or remained unnoticed. Belozerova also pointed out as evidence that, in memory of the Empress's daughter who died, the Italian sculptor Paolo Triscorni had already created a sculptural composition of a similar theme— a saddened young woman sitting with her head resting on her hand. The empress's daughter Maria died in July 1800, having lived just over a year. According to Belozerova, whose view was shared by many researchers, this same image was the basis for Betancourt’s design of the fountain. In 1806, the Empress had a second daughter, Elizabeth, but she died two years later. The Empress then began to lead a reclusive life, rarely leaving Tsarskoye Selo. Another reason for the Empress's seclusion and sadness was the death of her lover, the twenty-seven-year-old staff sergeant Alexei Okhotnikov of the Cavalry Regiment, from tuberculosis. According to palace rumors, Okhotnikov's death was actually a murder, orchestrated by Grand Duke Konstantin Pavlovich, who was unrequitedly in love with the Empress. This alleged event occurred while returning from a performance at the Hermitage Theater in January 1807.

Betancourt's biographer, Vladimir Pavlov, supported this version, noting that initially, the Tsarskoye Selo statue was surrounded by a chain-link fence, "like a monument on a conventional grave". Another confirmation of this interpretation, according to Pavlov, could be found in the lines of a poem by Alexander Pushkin. The poet, when describing the monument, mentions a shard and an urn (not a jug). The word “skull,” according to Pavlov, symbolized death, while the word “urn” (meaning "funeral") symbolized burial. The researcher argued that Pushkin was in love with the Emperor's wife and was familiar with her tragic fate, which allowed him to recognize the meaning the sculptor had intended for the statue. Pavlov also insisted that the depiction of Elizabeth Alexeevna’s appearance could be seen in other works by Sokolov. These include the sphinxes on the Egyptian Bridge (created in 1826, the year of the death of Alexander I's wife) and the three sculptures made by Sokolov for the niches of the Senate and Synod building: Theology, Spiritual Enlightenment, and Piety (the building was completed in 1832).

=== Art historians and cultural researchers on the artistic features of the fountain ===
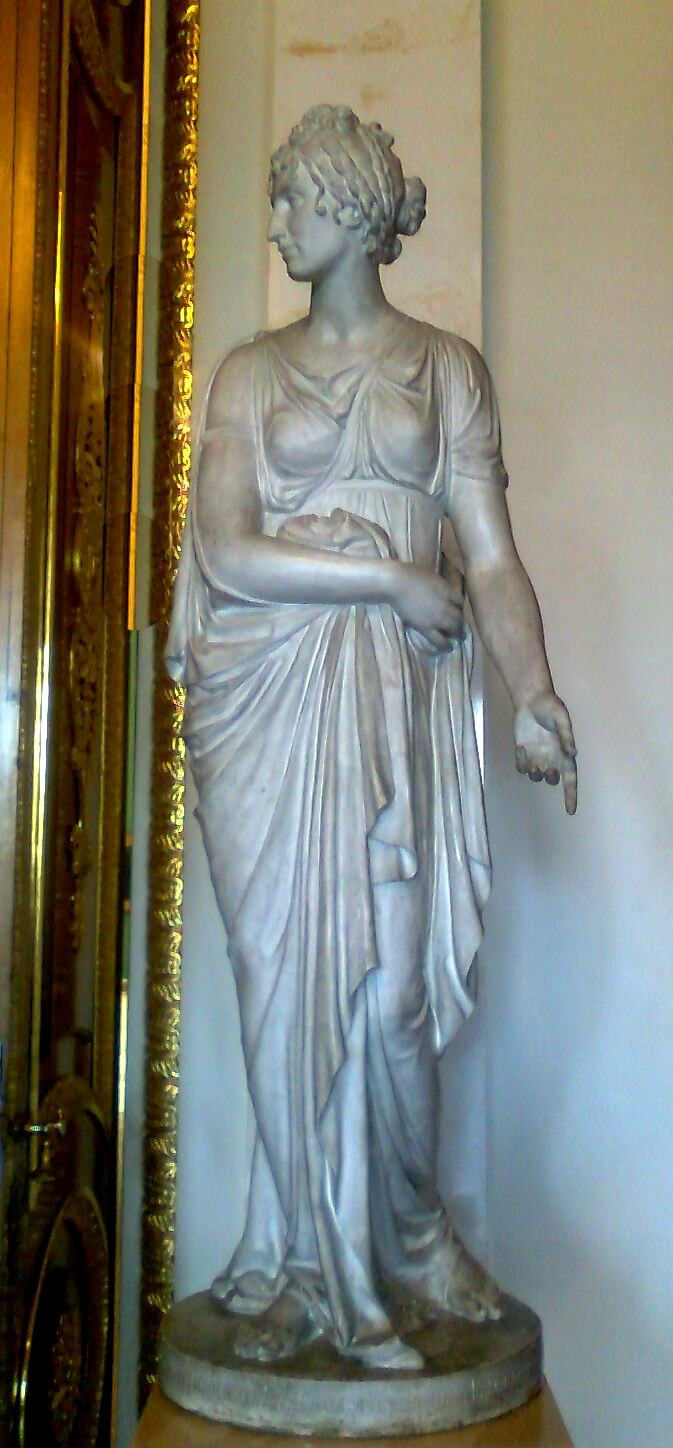
Ivan Martos. Figure of a mourner from Tombstone of Elizaveta Gagarina, 1803

Nikolai Antsiferov, a candidate of philology and cultural critic, highlighted the fountain's favorable location near the granite wharf on the lake shore, nestled in a small grove. He described the sculpture as a nymph wrapped in deep sadness. Antsiferov also found significance in the fact that the water from the spring does not freeze even in winter — the bronze statue is covered with a shroud of snow, and icicles hang from the jug, but the water continues to flow. He noted that Pushkin visited the fountain not only as a curly-haired boy during his studies at the Lyceum but also as an adult, coming from St. Petersburg during his long walks in later years.

Lydia (Tsira) Yemina, a researcher at the Catherine Palace Museum, observed that while La Fontaine concluded in his fable that dreams are futile, Sokolov's sculpture, in contrast, symbolizes the triumph of life's joy over sorrow. She viewed The Milkmaid as an example of Russian realist sculpture, highlighting its lyricism and truthfulness, despite some abstract qualities in Sokolov's work.

Soviet art historian Vsevolod Petrov argued that although “the sculptor started with a genre motif that carried an uncomplicated moral message and lacked any allusions to antiquity”, he subjected the subject to a “fundamental and radical restructuring.” He portrayed a beautiful girl in open, antique-style clothing, flowing down in wide decorative folds. In the figurative structure, no traces of genre remain. The sculptor transformed the everyday genre motif into something elegiac and sublime. Rather than depicting a French peasant, he presented a beautiful female figure in the spirit of classicist ideals about antiquity. Instead of moralizing, he imbued the statue with “abstract ... deep and poetic thought”. The girl's figure is freely unfolded, with rhythmic repetitions emphasized in the composition. The form is generalized and the musculature softened, with the sculptor highlighting the linear silhouette of the maiden. She is at rest, and the composition's primary focus is on her frontal and one lateral aspect (left of the viewer), where, according to Petrov, “the classical harmony of the silhouette is revealed with special clarity”. The art historian believed that stylistically, the sculpture aligns with the late works of the Alexander I era sculptor Theodosius Shchedrin and with Ivan Martos's tomb statue of Princess Elizabeth Gagarina.

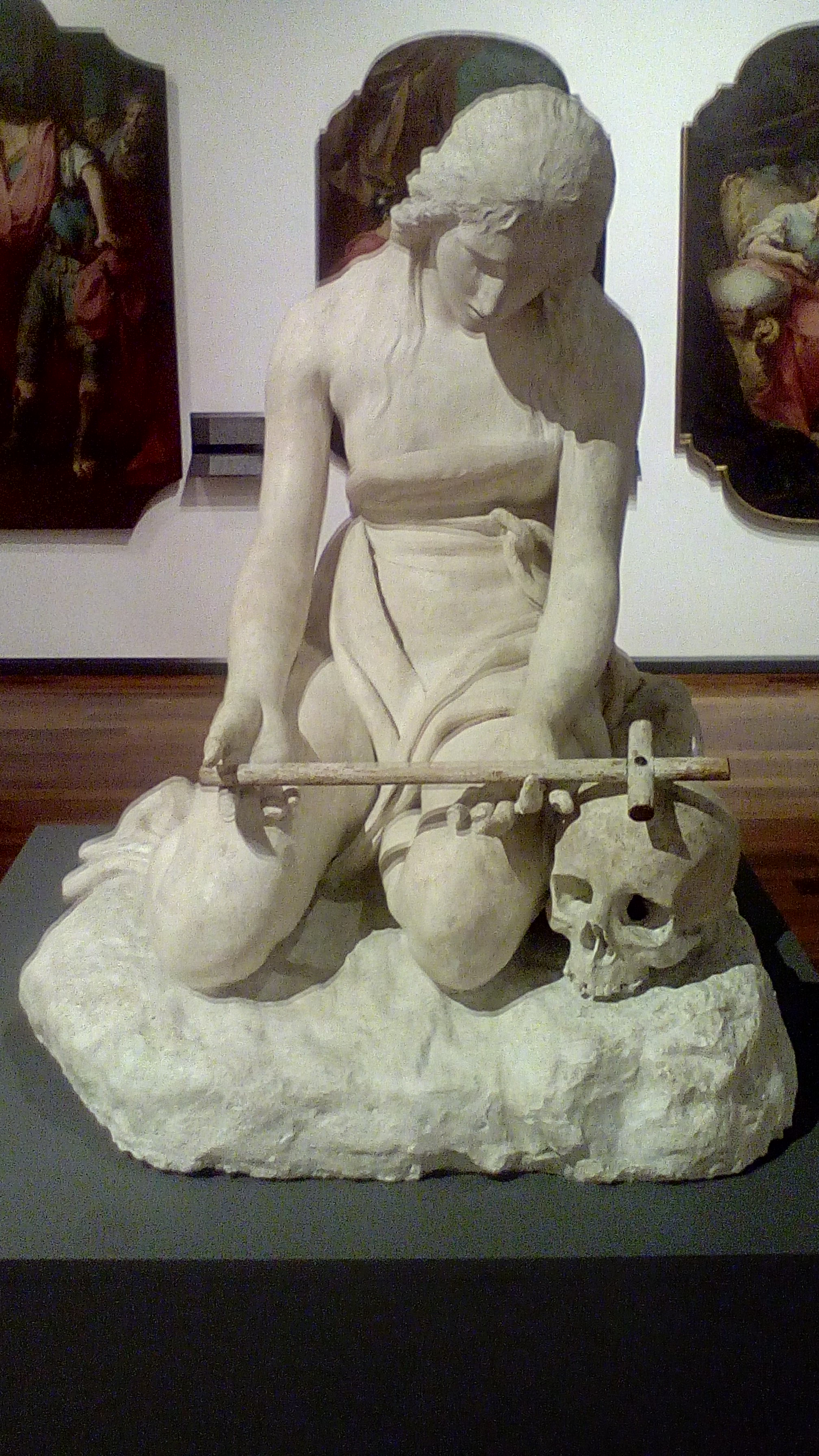
Antonio Canova. Penitent Magdalene

Soviet local historian Anatoly Petrov saw in the fountain “the sculptor’s aspiration to ideal, abstract beauty”. He noted the refined pose of the Milkmaid and the conventionality in conveying a deep sense of sadness. According to him, the scale of the figure “does not quite correspond to the size of the pedestal; it seems too miniature”. Soviet art historian Magdalina Rakova, an employee of the Research Institute of Theory and History of Fine Arts, remarked on the soft emotionality and exquisite silhouette of the girl’s sadly bowed head, lowered onto her arm. She observed that the genre motif is completely “devoid of everyday life”. Rakova considered the sculpture Girl with a Jug typical of the Empire style. In her view, the sculpture is aligned with the Empire direction in Western Europe, represented by Antonio Canova and Bertel Thorvaldsen, where the emotionality of their works is superficial, but they possess “smoothness of silhouette, simplicity of composition, and impeccable marble processing”.

Doctor of Philology Alexei Ilyichev wrote that Sokolov's sculpture conveys “only the most general idea – the sadness and sorrow of Pierrette”. The figure of the girl is executed in generalized classical forms. These classical outlines of the sculpture later provided Pushkin with the foundation for turning to the Greek epigrammatic genre. Of particular importance in the embodiment of the ideal of Greek beauty was the sculpture itself, which harmoniously combined “aesthetic and ethical qualities, balancing in the ideal of kalokagathia external and internal, body and spirit”. Beauty, conceptualized as wisdom, in Ilyichev’s view, proved to be the most significant element of the sculpture in this context. Soviet local historian Nina Semennikova also emphasized the influence of classicism on Sokolov’s sculpture. She wrote that the fountain seemed to be hidden from prying eyes behind shrubs and trees. She believed that the perfectly correct features of the girl's face and the slender proportions of her figure reflected the idea of perfect antique beauty. The roughly worked granite pedestal emphasizes the fragility of the girl.

Academician Dmitry Likhachev believed that the themes of Aesop's and La Fontaine's fables, which were quite common in gardening traditions before, did not disappear in the first half of the 19th century. Instead, they acquired a touch of "sensibility". In his opinion, this shift is especially reflected in the sculpture The Milkmaid. Pavel Sokolov emphasized not the moralizing aspect of La Fontaine's fable, but the sensitive "sensibility". According to Likhachev, Pushkin, in his poems, responded primarily to the “sensibility” of Tsarskoye Selo's nature, both through poetic sketches of Lorrain's landscapes and “the free philosophy contained in them”.

Russian local historian Elena Egorova wrote that Sokolov deepened the content of La Fontaine's fable. The sculpture depicts not a simple French peasant girl, but an antique girl. There is a partial plot similarity with the fable, but reminiscences are practically absent. Candidate of Art History Ludmila Doronina noted that “the perfectly molded figure, depicted in a natural and relaxed pose, evokes ancient examples”. She also wrote that the boulder on which the female figure is placed resembles natural examples, although it is “skillfully adjusted by the hand of a master” (which Doronina attributes to Betancourt), making the milkmaid look organically placed in a secluded corner of Catherine Park. The surrounding landscape emphasizes “the lyrical and sad intonation of the image”. Dmitry Kuznetsov, in the biography of Augustin Betancourt, wrote that the thin trickle of water oozing from the broken jug was intended to symbolize “the fragility of human existence and the ghostliness of airy castles”. The broken jug, from his point of view, should symbolize death, while the water that flows from it holds the secret of eternity—immortality.

== Fountain in art and literature ==
=== In poetry ===
According to Egorova, Pushkin, in his short poem Tsarskoye Selo Statue (1830), correctly understood the sculptor's idea with reference to ancient times. The poet included this poem in the cycle of Anphological Epigrams, which was created in the spirit of the ancient worldview. The poem itself was written in elegiac diction (hexameter and pentameter), a style popular in antiquity, and is an example of antique ekphrasis (a detailed description of a work of art). The poet also emphasized elements of daily life from the antique era inherent in the sculpture, such as hairstyles, clothing, and classical forms... Abram Tertz (the literary pseudonym of Andrei Sinyavsky) noted in connection with The Girl with the Jug that Pushkin “was drawn to statues, one must think, by the affinity of souls and coincidence in the idea—the desire to delay the fleeting moment, pouring it into a timeless, everlasting gesture”. Doctor of Philology Tatiana Malchukova observed that the manuscript autograph includes the title to the statue in Tsarskoye Selo, which she perceived as “an inscription to the statue”. In this poem, the researcher saw all the parameters of the epigram genre: “connection with the inscription, characteristic size, not avoiding repetition, simplicity and importance of style, and a two-part composition, unfolding the description of the 'monument of art' and capturing its beauty in an 'instant thought'”.

In Alexei Ilyichev's opinion, Pushkin's epigram is both a description of the Tsarskoye Selo statue and the myth of the girl's transformation into frozen stone and the emergence of an eternal spring. It is both descriptive and narrative in nature. According to Ilyichev, the text is divided into two parts: the first couplets contain a narrative microsyllable, unfolding in time from the past to the present ("dropped," "broke"; "sitting," "holding"), while the second couplet is a description of the fountain.

In 1832, the young poet Mikhail Delarue, a graduate of the fifth year of the Tsarskoye Selo Lyceum, published a poem titled Statue of Peretta in the Tsarskoye Selo Garden, with the note “from the German” (this phrase was later excluded in a subsequent edition, leading Doctor of Philological Sciences Sergei Kibalnik to suggest it was a hoax). It is known that Delarue was acquainted with Pushkin through the circle of Anton Delvig, and actively collaborated in Literaturnaya Gazeta and Northern Flowers, where Pushkin’s poem was published. Delarue's version reflected La Fontaine's plot more accurately than Pushkin’s, but his poem is considered much weaker (the opposite viewpoint was expressed by Boris Chukhlov). Some literary scholars believed Delarue’s poem to be a polemical response to Pushkin, as he “corrected” inaccuracies and shifted the emphasis from the statue to the fountain, turning it into an allegory of hope. In 1889, Konstantin Fofanov included a mention of the statue in his poem Thinking of Tsarskoye Selo. In 1861, Count Alexei Tolstoy wrote a parody of Pushkin’s poem about Sokolov’s sculpture, The Tsarskoye Selo Statue (1830).

Silver Age poets often referred to sculpture in their works. Innokenty Annensky, in a poem dedicated to L. I. Mikulich, described "the beautiful and mysterious image of Tsarskoye Selo Park" and saw in the girl with the jug not a French peasant, but a nymph. The poem by artist and poet Vasily Komarovsky, Neither this pavilion of porphyrogenous moping... (1916), is characterized, according to Elena Egorova, by a "deeply personal perception of sculpture," but it is far from the "conversion to eternity" seen in Pushkin’s poem. In the same year, Anna Akhmatova dedicated a poem to Molochnitsa. Other acmeists, such as Georgy Ivanov and Erich Hollerbach, also wrote about the sculpture.

The statue is mentioned in later poems by Vsevolod Rozhdestvensky Our stuffy temple is covered with a heavy dome (1920), Tatiana Gnedich The green park noises without fading (1958), and Anna Shidlovskaya Tsarskoye Selo Statue.

=== In music ===
In 1900, Russian composer Caesar Cui published the romance Tsarskoye Selo Statue to poems by Alexander Pushkin (Op. 57, No. 17). It is part of the cycle Twenty-five poems by Pushkin, written for the centenary of Pushkin in 1899 and first performed on December 17, 1900, in one of the concerts of the Kerzinsky circle in the hall of the Slavic Bazaar in Mosc

External videos
- | Cesar Cui. Romance "The Statue of Tsarskoye Selo". Performed by Boris Khristov
- | Gara Garayev. Piano piece "The Tsarskoye Selo Statue (after Pushkin)". Performed by Eldaniz Alekberzadeh

The audience gave each romance a standing ovation. The critic wrote: “In all romances, the authenticity of the verse is observed; they are beautiful, simple, small in volume, the text is merged with the music. Finally, they can even be sung by performers with average vocal abilities. Many of these romances can safely be predicted to achieve wide popularity in the musical world”.

At the beginning of the 20th century, there were already six musical arrangements of Pushkin's poem Tsarskoye Selo Statue. In 1937, Soviet composer Gara Garayev wrote a piano arrangement of The Tsarskoye Selo Statue (after Pushkin). (Note: Boris Chulkov mistakenly wrote that it was intended for symphony orchestra.)

=== In fine arts ===
The fountain attracted the attention of Russian artists, graphic artists, and illustrators. Andrei Martynov's lithograph is included in his series Views of St. Petersburg and its environs. The authors of the commentary edition of Pushkin's works noted the similarity between the sculpture in Tsarskoye Selo and the poet's drawing in Chapter III of Eugene Onegin (PD 835. L. 7 ob.), which depicts a grieving Tatiana. Literary scholar Elena Stupina wrote that the bend of the neck, hairstyle, curl falling on the neck, exposed shoulder, and the position of the hand coincide. Another confirmation she found in the draft of stanza XXXII, which is next to the drawing of Tatiana sitting on the bed, is the word “petrified”, which is next to a detailed verse description of Tatiana's body position. Stupina also mentioned another drawing, the reproduction of which she cited in her article: "Tatiana, bowing her head on her palm, stands at full height, turning away from the viewer". The notebook PD No. 835, in which both drawings are found, is known as the second Masonic notebook. In 1822, after the closure of the Masonic lodge “Ovid” in Kishinev, the treasurer of the lodge and a good acquaintance of Pushkin, Nikolai Alekseev, gave the poet three notebooks is in a leather binding, and on its cover is stamped the Masonic sign “OV” in a triangle.

The founder of photolithography in Russia, Albert May, in 1877, included a picture of the fountain in the album Views of Tsarskoye Selo.

Fountain in the fine art of the 19th century

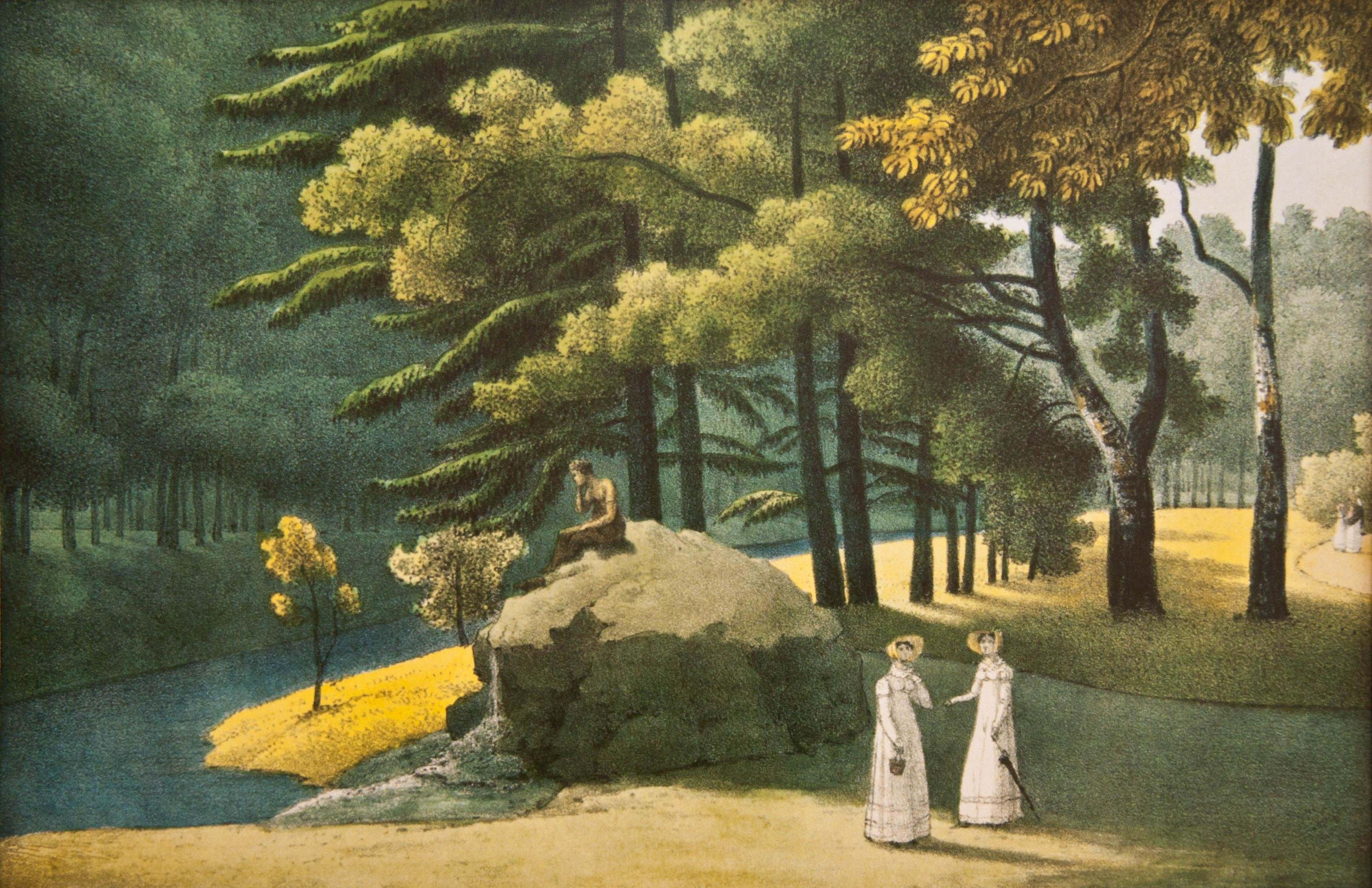
Andrei Martynov. Lithograph painted in watercolor, 1821-1822

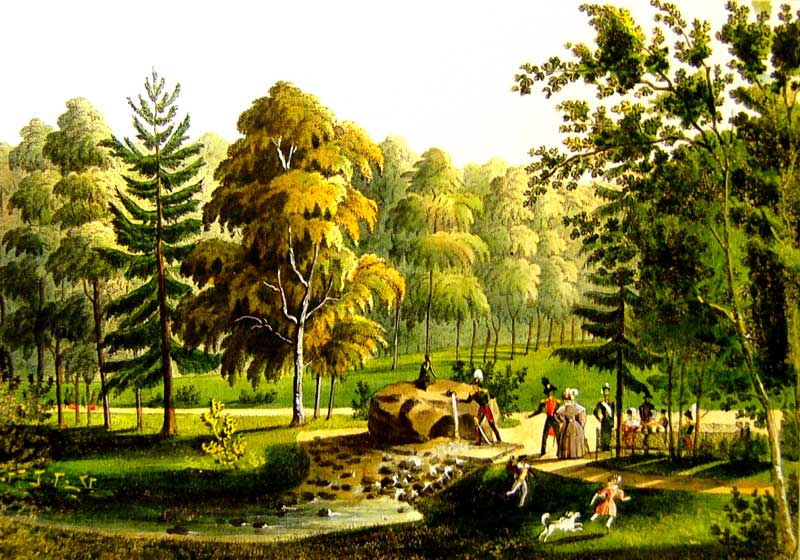
Anonymous. Landscape at the Fountain, lithograph, 1st half of the 19th century

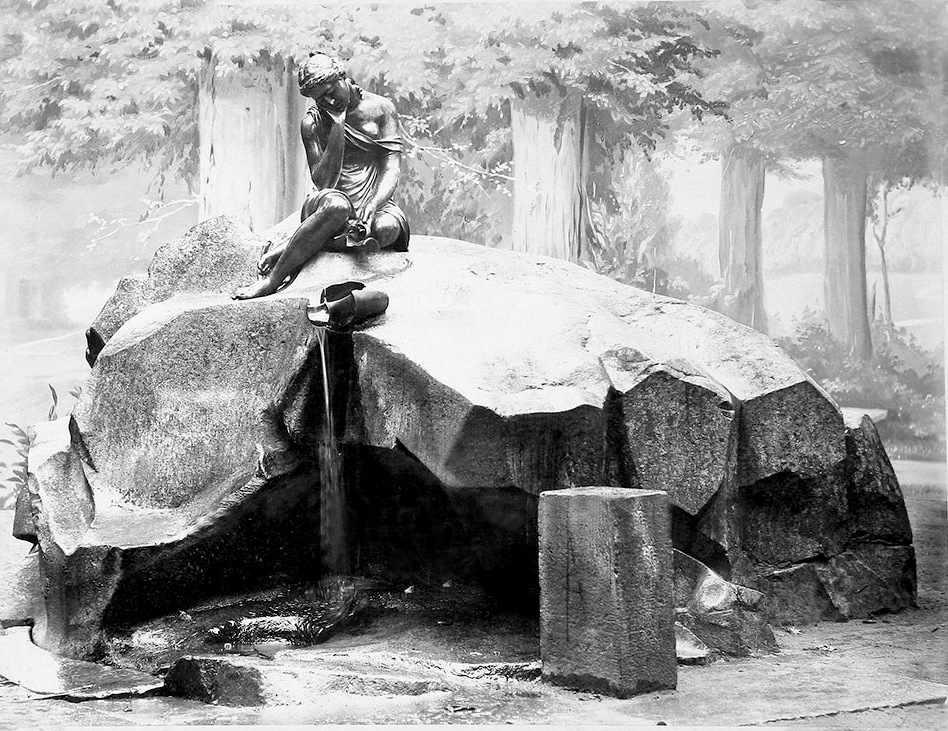
Albert May. Fountain Milkmaid in Catherine Park, 1877

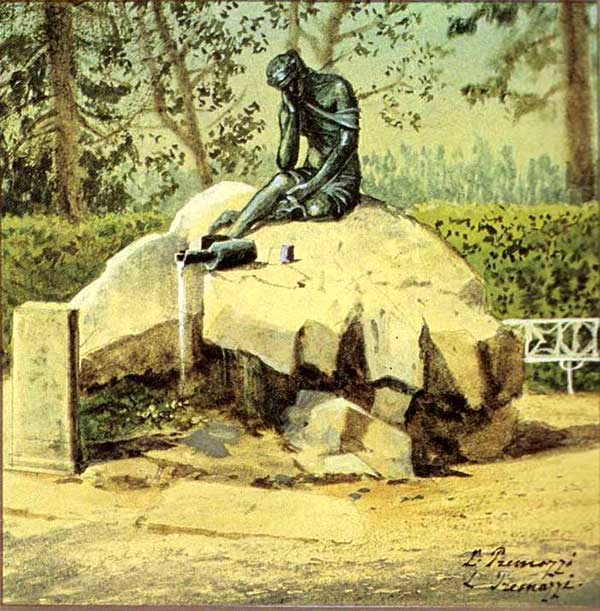
Luigi Premazzi. Girl with a Jug, watercolor of the late 19th century

== Bibliography ==
=== Sources ===
- Annensky, I. F. (1990). Л. И. Микулич // Стихотворения и трагедии [L. I. Mikulich // Poems and Tragedies]. Библиотека поэта. Большая серия (in Russian). Л.: Советский писатель. p. 640. ISBN 5-265-01480-2.
- «Муз бессмертная сестра»: Антология стихов русских поэтов о знаменитой царскосельской статуе «Девушка с разбитым кувшином», 1830—2000 [“The Immortal Sister of the Muses": Anthology of Poems by Russian Poets about the Famous Tsarskoye Selo Statue ‘Girl with a Broken Jug’, 1830-2000] (in Russian). Вологда: Легия. 2004. pp. 15–139.
- Akhmatova, А. А. (1998). Царскосельская статуя [Tsarskoye Selo statue] (in Russian). Vol. 1. Стихотворения. 1904—1941. М.: Эллис Лак. p. 966. ISBN 5-88889-030-8.
- Vilchkovsky, S. N. (1911). Царское Село [Tsarskoe Selo] (in Russian). М.: Товарищество Р. Голике и А. Вильборг. p. 277.
- Pushkin, A. S. (1959). Царскосельская статуя [Tsarskoye Selo statue] (in Russian). Vol. 2. Стихотворения 1823–1836. М.: Государственное издательство художественной литературы. p. 799.
- Pylyaev, M. I. (1889). "Глава XXII". Забытое прошлое окрестностей Петербурга [Forgotten past of St. Petersburg's suburbs] (in Russian). М.: Издательство А. С. Суворина. pp. 489–513.
- Svinyin, P. P. (1817). Царское село // Достопамятности Санкт-Петербурга и его окрестностей [Tsarskoye Selo // Dostopamyatnosti St. Petersburg and its environs] (in Russian). Vol. 2. СПб.: Издательство В. Плавильщикова. pp. 138–174.
- Fofanov, K. M. (2010). Дума в Царском Селе // Стихотворения и поэмы [Duma in Tsarskoye Selo // Poems and Poems]. Новая библиотека поэта (in Russian). СПб.: Пушкинский Дом. pp. 153–157. ISBN 978-5-87781-013-6.
- Yakovkin, I. F. (1830). Описание села Царского, или Спутник обозревающим оное с планом и краткими историческими объяснениями [Description of the village of Tsarskoye, or Companion to those who observe it with a plan and brief historical explanations] (in Russian). СПб.: Департамент народного просвещения. p. 190.

=== Researches and non-fiction ===
- Antsiferov, N. P. (1950). Пушкин в Царском Селе [Pushkin in Tsarskoye Selo] (in Russian). М.: Государственное издательство культурно-просветительной литературы. p. 79.
- Belozyorova, L. I. (2008). О чём грустит царскосельская статуя // Ангел Царя Александра [What the Tsarskoye Selo statue is sad about // Angel of Tsar Alexander]. Христианская культура: Пушкинская эпоха (in Russian). Vol. 26. М.: Genio Loci. p. 197. ISBN 978-5990-0655-67.
- Doronina, L. N. (2008). "Павел Петрович Соколов (1764—1835)". Мастера русской скульптуры XVIII—XX веков в 2 томах [Masters of Russian sculpture XVIII-XX centuries in 2 volumes]. Энциклопедия мирового искусства (in Russian). Vol. Скульптура XVIII—XIX веков. М.: Белый город. p. 440. ISBN 978-5-7793-1404-6.
- Dunayev, М. М. (1978). К югу от Москвы [To the south of Moscow] (in Russian). М.: Искусство. p. 184.
- Egorova, Е. N. (2006). "Царскосельская статуя". «Приют задумчивых дриад». Пушкинские усадьбы и парки [“The Refuge of Thoughtful Dryads”. Pushkin estates and parks] (in Russian). М.: Информационный центр. pp. 62–70. ISBN 5-900999-25-4.
- Emina, L. V. (1958). "Фонтан «Молочница» или «Девушка с кувшином»". Екатерининский парк города Пушкина. Путеводитель [Ekaterina's Park in Pushkin. Guide] (in Russian). Л.: Лениздат. pp. 76–80.
- Ilychev, A. V. (2004). Поэтика противоречия в творчестве А. С. Пушкина и русская литература конца XVIII — начала XIX века. Автореферат диссертации на соискание учёной степени доктора филологических наук [Poetics of contradiction in the work of A. S. Pushkin and Russian literature of the end of the XVIII - beginning of the XIX century. Abstract of the dissertation for the degree of Doctor of Philological Sciences.] (in Russian). Владивосток: Институт русского языка и литературы Дальневосточного государственного университета. p. 46.
- "Историко-литературный комментарий. «Анфологические эпиграммы»". Пушкин А. С. Сочинения. Комментированное издание [Pushkin A. С. Works. Commented edition] (in Russian). М.: Новое издательство. 2016. pp. 184–195. ISBN 978-5-98379-211-1.
- Kuznetsov, D. I. (2018). «Молочница с разбитым кувшином» // Бетанкур [“Milkmaid with the Broken Jug” // Betancourt]. Жизнь замечательных людей (in Russian). Vol. 1720. М.: Молодая гвардия. pp. 161–162. ISBN 978-5-235-04094-6.
- Kuznetsov, D. I. (2014). «Молочница с разбитым кувшином» // Бетанкур. Испанский творец Северной столицы [“Milkmaid with the Broken Jug” // Betancourt]. Человек-загадка (in Russian). Vol. 1720. М.: Вече. pp. 86–88. ISBN 978-5-4444-2320-2.
- Kyuchariants D. A., Raskin A. G. (2009). Сады и парки дворцовых ансамблей Санкт-Петербурга и пригородов [Gardens and parks of palace ensembles of St. Petersburg and suburbs] (in Russian). СПб.: Паритет. p. 368. ISBN 978-5-93437-160-0.
- Likhachev, D. S. (1998). Поэзия садов: К семантике садово-парковых стилей. Сад как текст [Poetry of Gardens: Toward a Semantics of Garden Styles. The garden as a text] (in Russian). М.: Согласие. p. 356.
- Malchukova, T. G. (1986). "О жанровых традициях в «Анфологических эпиграммах» А. С. Пушкина". Жанр и композиция литературного произведения. Петрозаводский государственный университет имени О. В. Куусинена [Genre and composition of a literary work. O. V. Kuusinen Petrozavodsk State University] (in Russian). Петрозаводск: Межвузовский сборник. pp. 64–82.
- Nazarov, A. F. (1989). Цезарь Антонович Кюи [Cesar Antonovich Cui] (in Russian). М.: Музыка. p. 224. ISBN 5-7140-0151-6.
- Pavlov, V. E. (2002). "В России". Августин Бетанкур (1758—1824). Учёный, инженер, архитектор, градостроитель [Augustin Betancourt (1758-1824). Scientist, engineer, architect, urban planner] (in Russian). Нижний Новгород: Нижегородский государственный университет имени Н. И. Лобачевского. p. 215.
- Pavlov, V. E. (2007). Русский испанец [The Russian Spaniard] (in Russian). СПб.: Петербургский государственный университет путей сообщения. p. 162.
- Petrov, V. N. (1962). "Молодое поколение скульпторов". История русского искусства в 13 томах (16 книгах) [History of Russian Art in 13 volumes (16 books)] (in Russian). Vol. 8. Book 1. М.: Издательство Академии наук СССР. pp. 317–369.
- Petrov, A. N. (1964). "Фонтан «Молочница»". Пушкин. Дворцы и парки [Pushkin. Palaces and parks] (in Russian). М.—Л.: Искусство. p. 232.
- Rakova, M. M. (1975). Русское искусство первой половины XIX века [Russian art of the first half of the XIX century]. Очерки теории и истории изобразительного искусства (in Russian). М.: Искусство. p. 239.
- Semennikova, N. V. (1987). Пушкин. Дворцы и парки. Издание второе, исправленное и дополненное [Pushkin. Palaces and parks. Second edition, corrected and supplemented] (in Russian). Л.: Искусство. p. 80.
- Semyonov, V. P. (2016). Девушка с кувшином. История знаменитого фонтана [The Girl with a pitcher. The history of the famous fountain] (in Russian). СПб.: Genio Loci. p. 32. Archived from the original on 11 January 2019.
- Serpinskaya T. V., Fedoseeva O. V. (2006). "Царское Село. Страницы истории императорской резиденции". Страницы истории императорской резиденции. Каталог выставки [Pages of the history of the imperial residence. Exhibition catalog] (in Russian). Екатеринбург: «АКВА-ПРЕСС». pp. 9–17.
- Stupina, E. A. (2012). Лицейский след в истории образа Татьяны. Штрихи к портрету // Материалы Михайловских Пушкинских чтений «…Одна великолепная цитата» [The Lyceum trace in the history of Tatyana's image. Strokes to the portrait // Materials of Mikhailovsky Pushkin Readings “...One splendid quotation”] (PDF). Михайловская пушкиниана (in Russian). Михайловское: Государственный музей-заповедник А.С. Пушкина «Михайловское». pp. 110–120. ISBN 978-5-94595-061-0. Archived from the original (PDF) on 26 December 2019.
- Terts, А. (2006). Прогулки с Пушкиным [Walks with Pushkin] (in Russian). М.: Глобулус, НЦ ЭНАС. pp. 9–17. ISBN 5-94851-101-4.
- Fomichev, S. A. (1983). "Рабочая тетрадь Пушкина ПД № 835 (Из текстологических наблюдений)". АН СССР. Институт русской литературы (Пушкинский Дом) [Academy of Sciences of the USSR. Institute of Russian Literature (Pushkin House)] (in Russian). Vol. 11. М.: Наука. pp. 27–65.
- Chulkov, B. A. (2004). "Бессмертная сестра муз". «Муз бессмертная сестра»: Антология стихов русских поэтов о знаменитой царскосельской статуе «Девушка с разбитым кувшином», 1830—2000 [“Muses immortal sister": an anthology of poems by Russian poets about the famous Tsarskoye Selo statue Girl with a pitcher, 1830-2000] (in Russian). Вологда: Легия. pp. 4–14.
