= Gorizont (newspaper) =

Russian-language newspaper in Colorado, US

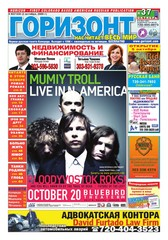
- Type: Weekly newspaper
- Format: 17" × 10.5" tabloid
- Owner(s): Anatoli Muchnik
- Publisher: Gorizont
- Editor: Leonid Reznikov
- Founded: 1995
- Website: gorizont.com

Gorizont (Russian: Горизонт, lit. 'Horizon') is the first major Russian-language newspaper in Colorado, United States. The newspaper serves the Russian-speaking community of the Denver metropolitan area. Gorizont was established in 1995 by Anatoli Muchnik. In 1996, Muchnik appointed Leonid Reznikov, a recently emigrated Russian scientist, as executive editor.

== Need for a Russian-language newspaper in Colorado ==
Gorizont began with reporting local cultural and business events and advertising for the fast-growing Russian community in Colorado. Starting in the mid-1990s, Gorizont became the community's main source of news from Russia in addition to its local coverage. This was due in part to the language barrier for the members of the community who spoke only Russian and relied upon Gorizont for translations of American current events and news.

In addition, articles in Gorizont introduced readers to the American lifestyle while preserving a link to Russian culture.

== Further development ==
In the 1990s, Internet access was still very limited, and few forums or discussion boards were available. Gorizont was the community instrument for communication, exchange of opinions and addressing issues of interest to the Russian-speaking community.

Gorizont did not disappear like other local Russian publications after satellite TV and the Internet became widely available to the Russian-speaking community. For many years, it has covered stories of Russians living in Colorado, reporting their business and career achievements, interviewed artists, actors, teachers, and scientists who have been prominent in the Russian community of Colorado. Gorizont has published over 70 articles on Russian veterans of World War II who moved to the United States and still reside in Colorado.

Gorizont is listed as organizer and supporter of many activities. It was sponsoring and supporting a number of annual festivals, including the first and second Annual Colorado European Festivals, first Russian Festival, beauty contests, education programs, including Limmud Colorado, concerts, art shows and other events significant for community and the state.

Gorizont supported connections between Russian and American communities. English-speaking reporters from major American publications were referring Gorizont in articles related to the Russian community of Colorado.

Gorizont was a means to publish important messages from official organizations both Russian and American.

Gorizont is in the list of publications distributed by Newspaperdirect, one of the largest Press Display agencies.

== Publication type ==
Gorizont is a newsprint, full-color and black-and-white, tabloid-style weekly newspaper published on Fridays. It targets the Russian community of Colorado, including Southeast Denver, Glendale, Aurora, Arvada, Thornton, Boulder, Colorado Springs, and Breckenridge.

Gorizont features editorials and analytical articles on various subjects, including current events, economy, employment, worldwide and local news including news from the United States, Russia, Israel, and Eastern Europe, interviews with politicians and celebrities, interviews with members of our community, recreational pages, "What to Do in Denver", "Colorado News with a Smile", complete TV guide (13 Russian TV channels), movie and play reviews, poetries and short stories by local authors, real estate news, crosswords, horoscopes, ongoing literature contests, photo beauty tournaments, and much more. The newspaper collaborates directly with major Russian periodicals, TV and news agencies that provide exclusive articles and information.

== Sources ==
- Russian Honorary Consulate General in Denver – About Community
- Colorado Secretary of State, Business Division – Document ID:19971150794
