= The Horizon: A Journal of the Color Line =

Monthly periodical 1907–1910

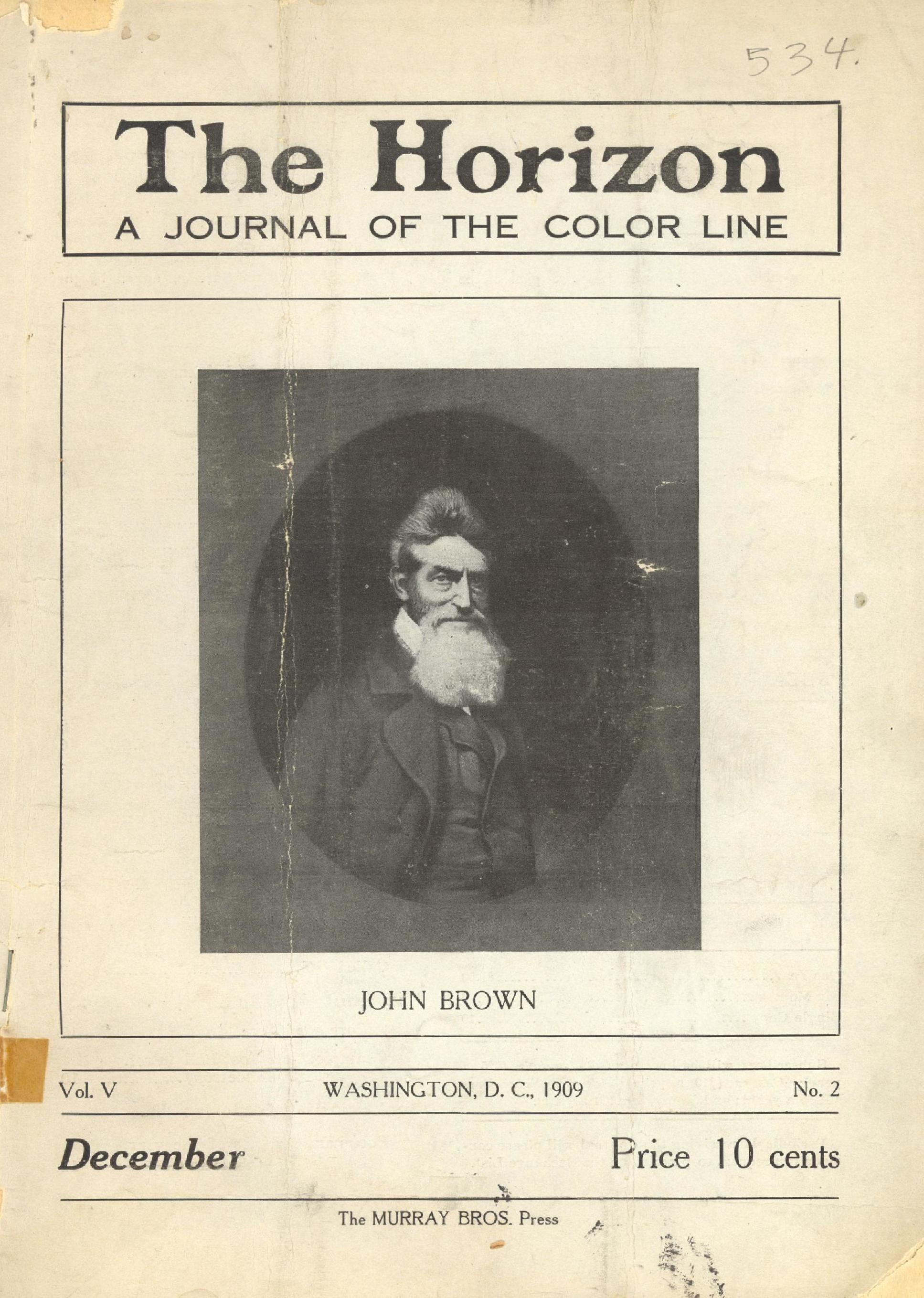
cover of the December 1909 issue of The Horizon

The Horizon: A Journal of the Color Line was a monthly periodical in publication during the years 1907 to 1910. The magazine was headquartered in Alexandria, Virginia. It was the primary communication outlet for the Niagara Movement, and was edited by African-American editor, scholar, and author W. E. B. Du Bois. The magazine was written primarily by African Americans and addressed many African-American themes. After the National Association for the Advancement of Colored People (NAACP) was formed, publication ceased as Du Bois turned his attention to the NAACP's magazine, The Crisis, which he also edited. Prior to The Horizon, Du Bois published a comparable magazine, Moon Illustrated Weekly, which lasted for one year in 1906.

The Horizon was a digest of news from other sources, but also included original works by Du Bois and other authors. The magazine typically consisted of three sections: "The In-Look" was a summary of important news from African-American press sources; "The Out-Look" was a digest of the periodical press, and "The Over-Look" contained opinion pieces, essays, and other original works by Du Bois and his associates.
