= Thomas Howell (poet) =

English poet

Thomas Howell (fl. 1568), was an English poet.

Howell was probably a native of Dunster in Somerset. He published in 1568 "The Arbor of Amitie, wherein is comprised pleasant Poems and pretie Poesies, set foorth by Thomas Howell, Gentleman", 8vo, 51 leaves (Bodleian Library), with a dedicatory epistle to Lady Ann Talbot. Howell appears to have been employed at this time in the household of the Earl of Shrewsbury. "New Sonnets and Pretty Pamphlets … Newly augmented, corrected, and amended", 4to, was licensed for publication in 1567-8. An imperfect, undated copy, supposed to be unique, is preserved in the Capell collection (Trinity College, Cambridge); it is dedicated "To his approved Freinde, Maister Henry Lassels, Gentilman". Several poems are addressed to John Keeper (a Somerset man), and some of Keeper's poems are included among "Newe Sonets".

Howell's latest work was "H. His Deuises, for his owne exercise, and his Friends pleasure. Vincit qui patitur", 1581, 4to, 51 leaves, preserved among Malone's books in the Bodleian Library. It appears from the dedicatory epistle that he was now in the service of the Countess of Pembroke (Mary Sidney), and that the poems were written at Wilton House "at ydle times … to auoyde greater ydlenesse or worse businesse". Howell's works have been reprinted in Dr. Grosart's "Occasional Issues".

Howell is thought to have been in the service of Bess of Hardwick.
