= Horizon (online magazine) =

Horizon is an online-only, open-access magazine covering research and innovation, published in Brussels since 2013 by the European Commission. It covers a wide range of topics, including agriculture, energy, environment, frontier research, health, ICT, industry, policy, science in society, security, social sciences, space and transport.

Horizon publishes two to three articles per week, mainly in English, and normally covers research and innovation projects which were funded by the European Union (EU) through its Framework Programmes for Research and Technological Development, such as FP7 and Horizon 2020, and through the European Research Council. Occasionally, Horizon also publishes policy announcements from the European Commission's Directorate-General for Research and Innovation.

Articles from Horizon Magazine can be republished under a license which requires simple attribution. Horizon articles have been shared or re-published, among others, by the European Space Agency, by the University of Oxford, by the Hebrew University of Jerusalem, by the University of Trento and by the Welfare State Futures Coordination Office at Humboldt University of Berlin and by the BBC's The Naked Scientists podcast.
