= Mike Makes His Mark =

- Directed by: Irving Rusinow
- Written by: Jarvis Couillard
- Produced by: Agrafilms, Inc.
- Edited by: Wilkes Straley
- Music by: Norman Lloyd
- Release date: 1955
- Running time: 30 minutes, 16 mm.
- Country: United States
- Language: English

Mike Makes His Mark is a 1955 educational American film directed by Irving Rusinow and produced by Agrafilms, Inc. for the National Education Association (NEA) and state education associations.

The film tells the story of 8th grader "Mike" who wishes to drop out of school, but with help from his teacher and guidance counselor finds activities that make him interested in school, while his friend Eddie is a ditch digger.

The film was the fifth in a series of NEA educational films, and it debuted at the NEA's annual convention in Chicago in July 1955.

== Credits ==
- Director - Irving Rusinow
- Script - Jarvis Couillard
- Photography - Pinckney Ridgell
- Editing - Wilkes Straley
- Music - Norman Lloyd
