= Save America's Treasures =

US government preservation program

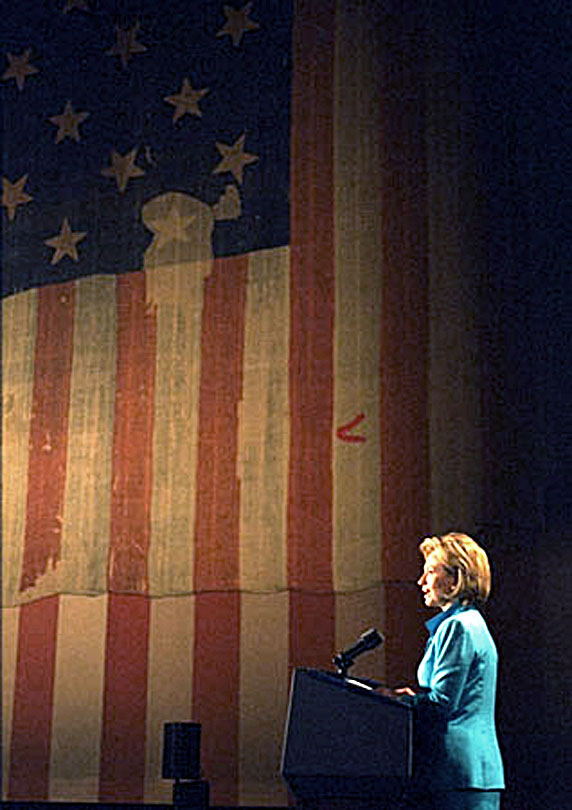
Hillary Clinton in front of the Star Spangled Banner, one of the first Save America's Treasures Projects, 1998

Save America's Treasures is a United States federal government initiative to preserve and protect historic buildings, arts, and published works. It is a public–private partnership between the U.S. National Park Service and the National Trust for Historic Preservation. The National Endowment for the Arts, National Endowment for the Humanities, and Institute of Museum and Library Services are also partners in the work. In the early years of the program, Heritage Preservation and the National Park Foundation were also involved.

== History ==
Save America's Treasures (SAT) was established by Executive Order 13072 in February 1998, under President Bill Clinton and in conjunction with the White House Millennium Council's activities. Instrumental in its founding was then-First Lady of the United States Hillary Rodham Clinton. Its Honorary Chair is traditionally the First Lady as designated by the President's Committee on the Arts and Humanities "Selection criteria require that each project be of national significance, demonstrate an urgent preservation need, have an educational or otherwise clear public benefit, and demonstrate the likely availability of non-federal matching funds. Each grant requires non-federal matching funds, which have stimulated contributions from states, localities, corporations, foundations, and individuals who value our shared heritage."

On December 9, 2009, First Lady Michelle Obama said, "Save America's Treasures invests in our nation's irreplaceable legacy of buildings, documents, collections, and artistic works. These awards empower communities all over the country to rescue and restore this priceless heritage, and ensure that future generations continue to learn from the voices, ideas, events, and people represented by these projects." Despite this initial endorsement, both the Save America's Treasures and the Preserve America grant programs were later eliminated by the Obama Administration. On January 30, 2010, President Barack Obama in his "Tough Choices" FY 2011 Budget proposed eliminating the Save America's Treasures and Preserve America grant programs, stating that "both programs lack rigorous performance metrics and evaluation efforts so the benefits are unclear." The National Trust for Historic Preservation eliminated its Save America's Treasures office in 2011 during a reorganization.

From 1999 – 2010, over $318 million was awarded, matched by over $400 million from other sources, resulting in the preservation of over 1,200 significant historic structures and repositories of cultural heritage. As of 2012, the program had been responsible for the creation of about 16,000 jobs. This corresponds to a cost of about $13,000 per job. In 2010, according to the American Architectural Foundation, there were 175 ongoing SAT projects.

Funding ceased after 2010 because of concerns about adequate "performance metrics and evaluation efforts", yet resumed in 2017.

Funding for the program comes from the Historic Preservation Fund (HPF), a source of revenue from federal oil leases that does not spend taxpayer dollars.

== List of official projects and awardees ==
The following list is sorted chronologically and by honorary chairman. Early awards were organized under Honorary Chairs (traditionally the First Lady of the United States) but recent awards do not identify an Honorary Chair.

=== Hillary Clinton, Honorary Chair ===
==== 1999 ($13 million awarded, 22 projects) ====
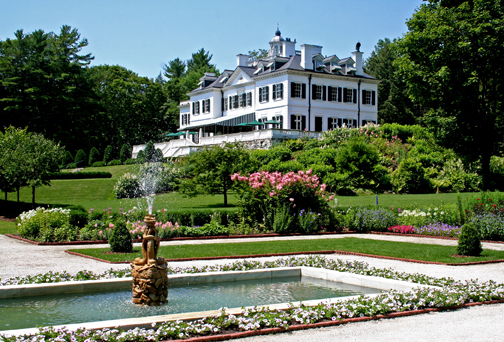
Edith Wharton's home, The Mount, Lenox, MA, 1999 Awardee

- Sloss Furnaces, Birmingham, AL
- Fort Egbert, Eagle, AK
- Recreation Hall, Kennecott Mine, Wrangell, St. Elias National Park and Preserve, Cooper Center, AK
- Manzanar National Historic Site, Independence, CA
- Sewall-Belmont House, Washington, D.C.
- Pelican Island National Wildlife Refuge, Sebastian, FL
- Ebenezer Baptist Church, Martin Luther King, Jr. National Historic Site, Atlanta, GA
- Commercial Pacific Cable Buildings and Former Naval Facilities, Midway National Wildlife Refuge, HI
- Experimental Breeder Reactor I, Idaho National Engineering and Environmental Laboratory, Scoville, ID
- Chesterwood, Stockbridge, MA
- The Mount, Lenox, MA ($2,865,000)
- Washburn "A" Mill, Minneapolis, MN
- Fourth Ward School, Virginia City, NV
- Buildings of the Manhattan Project, Los Alamos, NM
- Louis Armstrong House and Archives, Queens College, New York, NY
- The 1905 Wright Flyer III, Carillon Historical Park, Dayton, OH
- Paul Laurence Dunbar House and Barn, Dayton Aviation Heritage National Historical Park, Dayton, OH
- Fallingwater, Bear Run, PA
- The Letter Box, Grey Towers, Milford, PA
- Peter Wolf Administration Building, Fair Park, Dallas, TX
- Jackson Ward Historic District, Richmond, VA
- Taliesin, Spring Green, WI

==== 2000 ($30 million awarded) ====
- Saturn V Rocket, George C. Marshall Space Flight Center, Huntsville, AL ($700,000)
- Tannehill/Brierfield Ironworks, McCalla, AL ($250,000)
- Sitka Pioneer Home, Sitka, AK ($150,000)
- Unalaska Aerology Building, Unalaska, AK ($100,000)
- "Saving Southwest Traditions: The Pottery Project," Arizona State Museum, Tucson, AZ ($400,000)
- Gertrude Kurath, Eleanor King, and Joann Kealiinohomoku Collections, Flagstaff, AZ
- Little Rock Central High School National Historic Site, Little Rock, AR ($500,000)
- Angel Island Immigration Station, Tiburon, CA ($500,000)
- Knight Foundry Water-Powered Iron Works, Sutter Creek, CA ($250,000)
- Old First National Bank, Telluride, CO ($250,000)
- The Charter Murals, National Archives Building, Washington, D.C. ($500,000)
- Historic Sound Recording Collections of the American People, Smithsonian Institution, Washington, D. C. ($750,000)
- Anderson Cottage, United States Soldiers' and Airmen's Home, Washington, D.C. ($750,000)
- Halla Huhm Dance Collection, Dance Heritage Coalition, Honolulu, HI ($90,000)
- USS Missouri (BB-63), Honolulu, HI ($300,000)
- Woodbury County Courthouse, Sioux City, IA ($300,000)
- Cahokia Mounds Archaeological Collection, Illinois State Museum, Springfield, IL ($55,000)
- Edward E. Ayer American Indian History Collection, The Newberry Library, Chicago, IL ($125,000)
- John J. Glessner House, Chicago, IL ($250,000)
- Frederick C. Robie House, Chicago, IL ($250,000)
- Katherine Dunham Archives, East St. Louis, IL
- Indiana Cotton Mill, Cannelton, IN ($250,000)
- Chase County Courthouse, Cottonwood Falls, KS ($250,000)
- Africa House, Yucca House, and Prudhomme-Roquier House collectively known as Melrose Plantation, Natchitoches, LA ($250,000)
- Sotterley Plantation, Hollywood, MD ($400,000)
- Colonial Theatre, Pittsfield, MA ($400,000)
- Orchard House, Concord, MA ($400,000)
- American Antiquarian Society Library, Worcester, MA ($400,000)
- Cranbrook House, Bloomfield Hills, MI ($300,000)
- St. Louis Civil Court Records, St. Louis, MO ($175,000)
- Grand Opera House of Mississippi, Meridian, MS ($400,000)
- Silver Bow Public Archives, Butte, MT ($50,000)
- Stewart Indian Boarding School Historic District, Carson City, NE ($250,000)
- Canterbury Shaker Village, Canterbury, NH ($250,000)
- Laundry and Hospital Outbuilding at Ellis Island, Statue of Liberty National Monument, NJ ($500,000)
- Feather Cave Complex Collections Archaeological Collections, Albuquerque, NM ($75,000)
- Harriet Tubman National Historical Park, Auburn, NY ($450,000)
- The Tenement at 97 Orchard Street, New York, NY ($250,000)
- Records of the United States Sanitary Commission, New York, NY ($250,000)
- The Metropolitan Opera Radio and Television Archives, New York, NY ($200,000)
- Babe Ruth Scrapbooks, National Baseball Hall of Fame, Cooperstown, NY ($50,000)
- Union Tavern / Thomas Day House, Milton, NC ($250,000)
- Western Fine Arts Collection, Oklahoma City, OK ($140,000)
- Eastern State Penitentiary Historic Site, Philadelphia, PA ($500,000)
- 1777-78 Continental Army Winter Encampment Structures, Valley Forge National Historical Park, PA ($450,000)
- Fort San Felipe del Morro, San Juan National Historic Site, San Juan, PR ($750,000)
- Southeast Lighthouse, Block Island, RI ($300,000)
- Drayton Hall, Charleston, SC ($250,000)
- Corn Palace, Mitchell, SD ($400,000)
- The Hermitage, near Nashville, TN ($340,000)
- Promontory Cave Collection, Utah Museum of Natural History, Salt Lake City, UT ($50,000)
- B & O Railroad Roundhouse Complex, Martinsburg, WV ($500,000)
- Ten Chimneys, Genesee Depot, WI ($250,000)

==== 2001 ($15 million awarded, 63 projects) ====
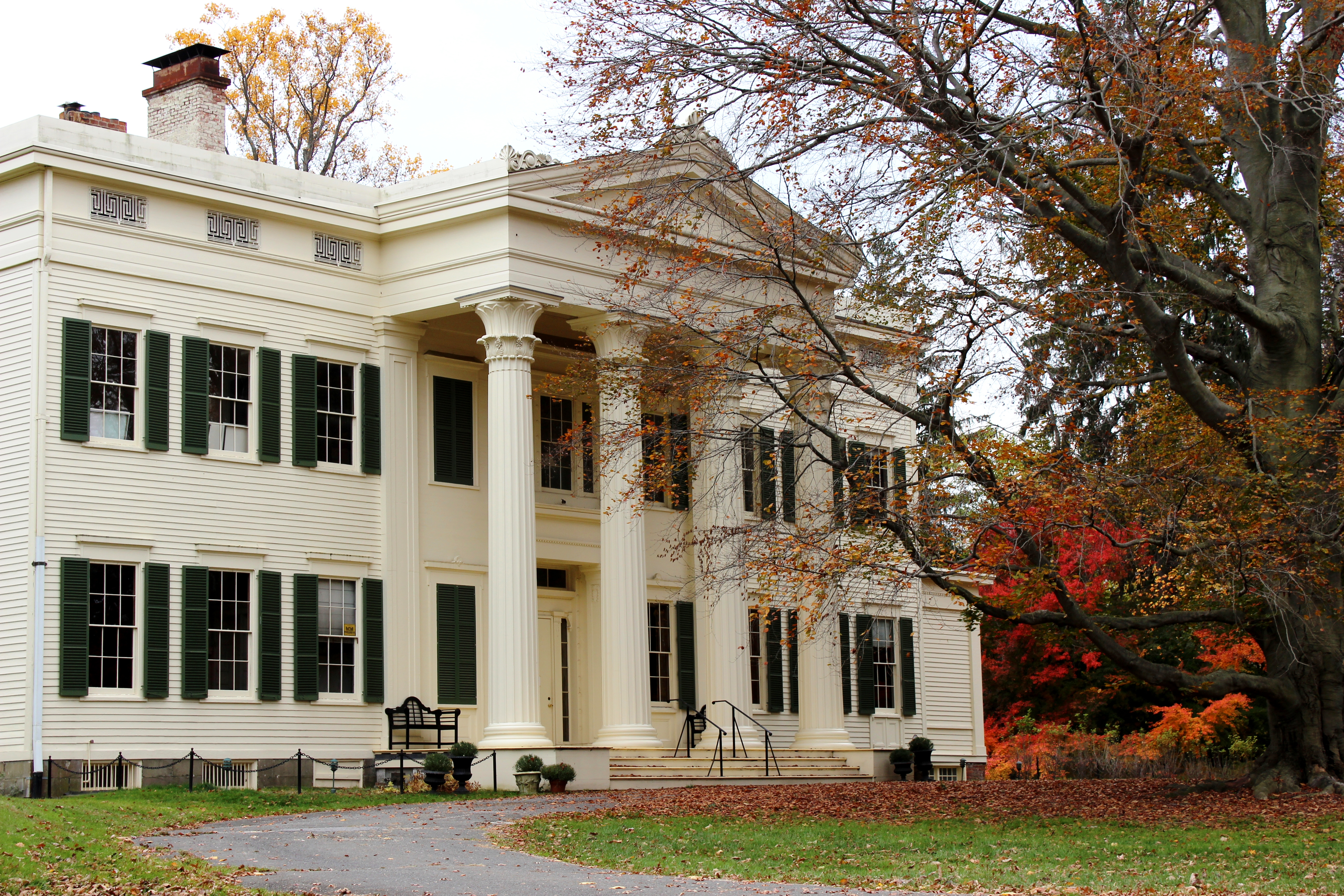
1838 Peter Augustus Jay House Rye, NY, 2002 Awardee

- Fort Mitchell Historic Site, AL ($300,000)
- Harrison Brothers Hardware, AL ($100,000)
- Pickens County Courthouse, AL ($100,000)
- USS Alabama (BB-60), AL ($250,000)
- Alaska Moving Image Preservation Association, AK ($500,000)
- Camp Ouachita, AR ($365,000)
- Florence Griswold Museum, Old Lyme, CT ($100,000)
- Hill-Stead Museum, CT ($115,000)
- Bishop Museum Moving Image Collection, HI ($50,000)
- Englert Theatre, Iowa City, IA ($365,000)
- Hegeler-Carus Mansion, IL ($200,000)
- Bailly Chapel House, IN ($200,000)
- Quindaro Archaeological Site Preservation, KS ($200,000)
- River Heritage Museum (later renamed the River Discovery Center), Paducah, McCracken County, KY ($250,000)
- Shreveport Oakland Cemetery, LA ($365,000)
- Taunton City Hall, Taunton, MA ($250,000)
- Mahaiwe Theater, MA ($250,000)
- Documentation of the Immigrant Experience, MN ($250,000)
- George Ohr Museum and Cultural Center, MS ($425,000)
- Audubon's Birds of America, University of Missouri, MO ($155,000)
- Eagle Block Rehabilitation, NH ($250,000)
- Belknap Mill, NH ($250,000)
- Lincoln Historic Building, NM ($1,000,000)
- 1901 Pan Am Building, New York, NY ($100,000)
- Hangar Restoration and Tuskegee Airmen Exhibits, American Airpower Museum, NY ($200,000)
- 1838 Peter Augustus Jay House at the Jay Heritage Center Rye, NY ($100,000)
- Lion House at the Bronx Zoo, NY ($200,000)
- Scarsdale National Historic Railroad Station, NY ($100,000)
- State Theatre, NY ($150,000)
- Franklin House, NY ($100,000)
- Biltmore Forest School, NC ($300,000)
- Akron Civic Theatre, OH ($500,000)
- Restoration of XC–99 Aircraft, National Museum of the United States Air Force, OH ($200,000)
- Harborview (Great Lakes Historical Society), OH ($100,000)
- Wooster City Schools Administrative Building, OH ($500,000)
- Artifact Preservation, Lewis and Clark College, OR ($400,000)
- Academy of Music, Philadelphia Orchestra, PA ($200,000)
- Scranton Cultural Center, PA ($250,000)
- Paul Robeson House, PA ($200,000)
- Masonic Temple, PA ($200,000)
- Pawtucket Armory, RI ($250,000)
- Robert Mills Courthouse, Camden, SC ($330,000)
- University of South Dakota Old Women's Gym/ Original Armory, SD ($365,000)
- University of Vermont Morgan Horse Farm, VT ($365,000)
- Spaulding Grade School, Vermont Historical Society, Barre, VT ($365,000)
- Fort Nisqually, WA ($250,000)
- B&O Railroad/Vanadalia Corridor Restoration, WV ($200,000)
- Charles Washington Hall, WV ($200,000)
- Frederick Douglass Junior and Senior High School, Huntington, WV ($270,000)
- Restoration, Arthurdale Historic Community, WV ($300,000)
- Civil War Regimental Flag Collection, West Virginia State Museum, WV ($95,000)
- Lincoln Courthouse, WI ($280,000)

==== 2002 ($15.6 million awarded) ====
- Tuskegee Airmen Oral History Recordings, Tuskegee Airmen National Historic Site, Tuskegee AL ($162,000)
- Lakeport Plantation Home, Lake Village, AL ($320,000)
- Kinishba Ruins, Whiteriver, AZ ($283,000)
- Memorial Hall, Phoenix Indian School, Phoenix, AZ ($200,000)
- Gamble House, Pasadena, CA ($350,000)
- Keystone-Mast Stereographic Collection, Regents of the University of California, Riverside, CA ($500,000)
- Pier 1, San Francisco Port of Embarkation, Golden Gate National Recreation Area, San Francisco, CA ($341,000)
- Colorado Fuel & Iron Company Archives, Pueblo, CO ($102,000)
- Yellow Jacket and Shields Pueblos Artifact Collections, Crow Canyon Archaeological Center, Cortez, CO ($65,000)
- Wadsworth Athenaeum Museum of Art, Hartford, CT ($250,000)
- New Castle Courthouse, New Castle, DE ($200,000)
- Scurlock Photographic Studio Records, Smithsonian Institution, Washington, D.C. ($125,000)
- Tudor Place, Washington, D.C. ($100,000)
- World Trade Center Model, Octagon Museum/American Architectural Foundation Collection, Washington, D.C. ($62,000)
- Tampa Bay Hotel, Tampa, FL ($400,000)
- Chamberlain House, Honolulu, HI ($310,000)
- Hawaiian Cultural Collection, Bishop Museum, Honolulu, HI ($75,000)
- Carey Act Maps, Idaho State Historical Society, Boise, ID ($73,000)
- Columbus Park, Chicago, IL ($200,000)
- North American Ethnographic and Archaeological Collection, Field Museum, Chicago, IL ($400,000)
- Iowa Battle Flag Collection, Iowa Department of Cultural Affairs, Des Moines, IA ($144,000)
- Appalshop Archive, Whitesburg, KY ($135,000)
- New Orleans Notarial Archives, New Orleans, LA ($64,000)
- Charles Carroll House, Annapolis, MD ($200,000)
- George Peabody Library, Baltimore, MD ($325,000)
- Star Spangled Banner Flag House, Baltimore, MD ($200,000)
- Fenway Studios, Boston, MA ($250,000)
- Jeremiah Lee Mansion Wallpaper Collection, Marblehead, MA ($70,000)
- Massachusetts Historical Society Manuscript Collection, Boston, MA ($169,000)
- McKim Building, Boston Public Library, Boston, MA ($470,000)
- Old North Church, Boston, MA ($317,000)
- American Collection, Flint Institute of Arts, Flint, MI ($300,000)
- Beaver Island Light Station, Beaver Island, MI ($150,000)
- Detroit Institute of Arts, Detroit, MI ($500,000)
- Rosa Parks Bus, Henry Ford Museum and Greenfield Village, Dearborn, MI ($205,000)
- Mimbres Pottery Collection, Frederick R. Weisman Museum, University of Minnesota, Minneapolis, MN ($116,000)
- John Baker Film Collection, American Jazz Museum, Kansas City, MO ($96,000)
- Louisiana Purchase Transfer Collection, William Clark Family Collection, Meriwether Lewis Collection and Thomas Jefferson Collection, Missouri Historical Society, St. Louis, MO ($140,000)
- World War II Seventh Ferrying Group Collection, Cascade County Historical Society Museum, Great Falls, MT ($125,000)
- Nebraska State Capitol, Lincoln, NE ($500,000)
- CCC/WPA Collections at 11 National Park Units in Arizona, Colorado and New Mexico, Bandelier National Monument, Los Alamos, NM ($125,000)
- Daisy Decelerator, Alamogordo, NM ($54,000)
- Institute of American Indian Arts Museum, Santa Fe, NM ($250,000)
- Salmon Ruins Collections, Salmon Ruins Museum, Bloomfield, NM ($175,000)
- Industrial Removal Office Collection, Center for Jewish History, New York, NY ($78,000)
- LOOK Magazine Photographic Collection, Museum of the City of New York, New York, NY ($64,000)
- Luykas Van Alen House, Kinderhook, NY ($175,000)
- New York City Ballet Archives, New York, NY ($300,000)
- Pollock-Krasner House and Study Center, East Hampton, NY ($107,000)
- Utica State Hospital, Utica, NY ($200,000)
- Chowan County Courthouse, Edenton, NC ($208,000)
- James Thurber Collection, Ohio State University, Columbus, OH ($58,000)
- Vista House, Crown Point State Park, Corbett, OR ($200,000)
- George Washington Sleeping Tent Exterior, Valley Forge National Historical Park, Valley Forge, PA ($286,000)
- Paper Collections, Historical Society of Pennsylvania, Philadelphia, PA ($54,000)
- Lincoln Railroad Station, Gettysburg, PA ($125,000)
- Moland House, Hartsville, PA ($175,000)
- Pennsylvania's Basic Documents, Native American Deeds, and Proprietary Surveys, Pennsylvania Historical and Museum Commission, Harrisburg, PA ($52,000)
- Thomas Jefferson Fossil Collection, Academy of Natural Sciences, Philadelphia, PA ($63,000)
- Hacienda La Esperanza, Manati, PR ($200,000)
- Charles I. D. Looff Carousel, East Providence, RI ($150,000)
- Schooner Yacht Coronet, International Yacht Restoration School, Newport, RI ($350,000)
- The Breakers, Newport, RI ($250,000)
- Fort Hill Collections, Clemson, SC ($73,000)
- Marian McPartland's Piano Jazz Collection, ETV Endowment of South Carolina, Columbia, SC ($81,000)
- LaSalle's La Belle Shipwreck & Artifacts, Texas Historical Commission, Austin, TX ($300,000)
- Sculptures, Fountain Pylons and Bas-Reliefs, Fair Park, Dallas, TX ($200,000)
- Spanish Colonial Heritage Material, University of Texas, San Antonio, TX ($56,000)
- Spring City Old School, Spring City, UT ($100,000)
- Painted Theater Curtains of Vermont, Vermont Museum & Gallery Alliance, Woodstock, VT ($150,000)
- Shelburne House, Shelburne Farms, Shelburne, VT ($215,000)
- St. Johnsbury Athenaeum, St. Johnsbury, VT ($399,000)
- Menokin, Warsaw, VA ($366,000)
- Monumental Church, Richmond, VA ($319,000)
- USS Monitor Collection, The Mariner's Museum, Newport News, VA ($100,000)
- Washington Monument Sculpture Group, Commonwealth of Virginia, Department of General Services, Richmond, VA ($50,000)
- Women's Memorial Collection, Women in Military Service, Arlington, VA ($237,000)
- Tugboat Arthur Foss, Northwest Seaport Maritime Heritage Center, Seattle, WA ($150,000)
- USS Cobia Archival Collection, Wisconsin Maritime Museum, Manitowoc, WI ($100,000)
- Historic Drawings and Documents Collection, Yellowstone National Park, Yellowstone, WY ($60,000)

=== Laura Bush, Honorary Chair ===
==== 2003 ($14.4 million awarded) ====
- SS Jeremiah O'Brien, National Liberty Ship Memorial, San Francisco, CA ($200,000)
- Naropa Audio Archive, Naropa University, Boulder, CO ($100,000)
- Lyme Art Colony Panel Paintings, Florence Griswold House, Florence Griswold Museum, Old Lyme, CT ($150,000)
- Oral History of American Music, Yale University School of Music and Library, New Haven, CT ($148,000)
- John Rogers Sculpture Groups and Studio, New Canaan Historical Society, New Canaan, CT ($95,000)
- Washington Star Photograph Collection, District of Columbia Public Library, Washington, D.C. ($75,000)
- Eagle Film City/Richard Norman Silent Film Studios, Jacksonville/Duval County Consolidated Government, Jacksonville, FL ($225,000)
- North End Plantation Tabby Buildings, Ossabaw Island Foundation, Ossabaw Island, GA ($400,000)
- Civil War Naval Flag Collection, National Civil War Naval Museum, Columbus, GA ($68,000)
- Riverside Water Tower, Village of Riverside, IL ($275,000)
- Fountain of Time, Chicago Park District, Chicago, IL ($250,000)
- St. Stephen's African Methodist Episcopal Church, Jefferson County, IN ($99,000)
- United States Marine Hospital, Louisville/Jefferson Metropolitan Government, Louisville, KY ($375,000)
- Skolfield-Whittier House Collections, Pejepscot Historical Society, Brunswick, ME ($50,000)
- Lockhouses, Chesapeake and Ohio Canal National Historical Park, Hagerstown, MD ($150,000)
- Locomotive Collection, B&O Railroad Museum, Baltimore, MD ($500,000)
- Sound Collection, National Council for the Traditional Arts, Silver Spring, MD ($150,000)
- John Quincy Adams' Diary, Massachusetts Historical Society, Boston, MA ($100,000)
- Gardens and Grounds, Longfellow National Historic Site, Cambridge, MA ($200,000)
- Hemingway Collection, Kennedy Library, Boston, MA ($150,000)
- Old North Church, Old North Foundation, Boston, MA ($317,000)
- Eudora Welty House, Mississippi Department of Archives and History, Jackson, MS ($251,000)
- L.Q.C. Lamar House, Oxford-Lafayette County Heritage Foundation, Oxford, MS ($390,000)
- Daniel Boone Home, Lindenwold University, Defiance, MO ($200,000)
- Arbor Lodge State Historical Park and Arboretum, Nebraska Game and Parks Commission, Nebraska City, NE ($254,000)
- Seton Castle, Academy for the Love of Learning, Seton Village, NM ($330,000)
- Luna County Courthouse, Luna County, Deming, NM ($340,000)
- Diorama Hall, Suffolk County Vanderbilt Museum, Centerport, NY ($135,000)
- Fort Ticonderoga, Fort Ticonderoga Association, Ticonderoga, NY ($275,000)
- Motion Picture Collection, George Eastman Museum, Rochester, NY ($380,000)
- Jean Hasbrouck House, Huguenot Historical Society, New Paltz, NY ($250,000)
- George Balanchine Foundation Video Archives, George Balanchine Foundation, New York, NY ($50,000)
- Olana, Olana State Historic Site/Olana Partnership, Hudson, NY ($250,000)
- General Electric Photograph Collection, Museum of Innovation and Science, Schenectady, NY ($100,000)
- Round Lake Auditorium, Village of Round Lake, NY ($225,000)
- Fletcher-Sinclair Mansion, Ukrainian Institute of America, New York, NY ($270,000)
- Perimeter Fence, New York Botanical Garden, New York, NY ($200,000)
- Eldridge Street Synagogue, Eldridge Street Project, New York, NY ($300,000)
- North Carolina Archeological Collection, University of North Carolina, Chapel Hill, NC ($450,000)
- Showboat Majestic, Cincinnati Recreation Commission, Cincinnati, OH ($150,000)
- Cincinnati Union Terminal, Cincinnati Museum Center, Cincinnati, OH ($250,000)
- Julian P. Kanter Political Commercial Archive, University of Oklahoma, Norman, OK ($135,000)
- Thomas Kay Woolen Mill, Mission Mill Museum Association, Salem, OR ($250,000)
- Moravian Pottery and Tile Works, Bucks County Department of Parks and Recreation, Doylestown, PA ($240,000)
- City Hall Tower Sculpture, City of Philadelphia Department of Arts and Culture, PA ($300,000)
- Cliveden (Benjamin Chew House), National Trust for Historic Preservation, Philadelphia, PA ($300,000)
- Blacksmith Shop, Cambria Iron Works, Johnstown Area Heritage Association, Johnstown, PA ($261,925)
- Benjamin Franklin Tercentenary Collections, The Library Company of Philadelphia, Philadelphia, PA ($300,000)
- Early American Sheet Music Collection, Free Library of Philadelphia, Philadelphia, PA ($135,000)
- Wright Brothers Aeronautical Engineering Collection, The Franklin Institute, Philadelphia, PA ($60,000)
- Touro Synagogue, Touro Foundation, Newport, RI ($375,000)
- John N. A. Griswold House, Newport, RI ($250,000)
- Old Charleston Jail, American College of the Building Arts, Charleston, SC ($500,000)
- Acetate and Vinyl Recording Transcriptions, Country Music Foundation, Nashville, TN ($214,000)
- Elisabet Ney Studio Formosa, City of Austin Parks and Recreation Department, TX ($250,000)
- Mission Concepcion, San Antonio, TX ($215,000)
- Calvin Coolidge Homestead, Vermont Division for Historic Preservation, Plymouth, VT ($200,000)
- Robbins & Lawrence Armory and Machine Shop, American Precision Museum, Windsor, VT ($200,000)
- Stratford Hall, Robert E. Lee Memorial Association, Stratford, VA ($200,000)
- City Hall, Jefferson County Historical Society, Port Townsend, WA ($280,000)
- Milton House, Milton Historical Society, Milton, WI ($275,000)

==== 2004 ($14.5 million awarded) ====
- Grand Jury Building, Eutaw, AL ($429,639)
- Pastime Theatre, Winfield, AL ($49,385)
- Pond Spring (General Joseph Wheeler Home), Hillsboro, AL ($148,152)
- Ward Chapel AME Episcopal Church and Museum, Prattville, AL ($197,535)
- Five Finger Islands Light Lighthouse, Juneau, AK ($197,535)
- Mission San Xavier del Bac, Patronato San Xavier, Tucson, AZ ($250,000)
- Taliesin West, Scottsdale, AZ ($74,076)
- Locke Historic Building House, Locke, CA ($500,000)
- Thomas Hansford Williams House, Gold Discovery Park Association, Coloma, CA ($200,000)
- Southwest Museum of the American Indian Collection, Los Angeles, CA ($500,000)
- Preservation of the R. Buckminster Fuller Audio and Video Holdings, Stanford University, Stanford, CA ($128,000)
- Leo Carillo Ranch, Carlsbad, CA ($197,535)
- Emporium Building, San Francisco, CA ($197,535)
- Estudillo Mansion, San Jacinto, CA ($246,919)
- Fremont Adobe, Monterey, CA ($148,152)
- Lopez Adobe, San Fernando, CA ($148,152)
- Joseph Webb House, Webb-Deane-Stevens Museum, Wethersfield, CT ($150,000)
- Litchfield Meetinghouse, First Congregational Church of Litchfield, Litchfield, CT ($200,000)
- Cheney Brothers Machine Shop, Manchester, CT ($200,000)
- Avery Point Lighthouse, Groton, CT ($98,768)
- Henry Whitfield House, Guilford, CT ($148,152)
- Mary Church Terrell House, Washington, D.C. ($260,000)
- Ximenez-Fatio House, St. Augustine, FL ($200,000)
- Sears Art Deco Tower, Miami, FL ($123,460)
- Andrew Low House, Savannah, GA ($250,000)
- Peabody Awards Collection at the University of Georgia, Athens, GA ($350,000)
- Grand Opera House, Mercer University, Macon, GA ($246,919)
- Hardman Art Building, Mercer University, Macon, GA ($148,152)
- Conserving, Reformatting, and Re-housing the Carl Sandburg Collection, University of Illinois at Urbana-Champaign, Urbana, IL ($239,000)
- Adlai Stevenson House, Mettawa, IL ($98,768)
- Feehan Memorial Library, University of Saint Mary of the Lake, Mundelein, IL ($197,535)
- DuPage Theatre, Lombard, IL ($296,303)
- Amana Mill Race, Amana, IA ($295,000)
- Dubuque Shot Tower, Dubuque, IA ($295,000)
- Steamboat William M. Black, Dubuque, IA ($255,637),
- Karl L. King Band Shell, Fort Dodge, IA ($249,882)
- Murphy-Bromelsick House, Lawrence, KS ($98,768)
- Augusta Theater, Augusta, KS ($148,152)
- Hotel Metropolitan, Paducah, KY ($246,919)
- Old State Capitol Paintings, Frankfort, KY ($74,076)
- Sunny Hill Pavilion, Iroquois Park, Louisville, KY ($197,535)
- Bogalusa City Hall, Bogalusa, LA ($98,768)
- Frank's Theater, Abbeville, LA ($98,768)
- Grand Opera House of the South, Crowley, LA ($148,152)
- McKinley High School, Baton Rouge, LA ($98,768)
- Municipal Auditorium, Shreveport, LA ($98,768)
- Kennebec Arsenal, Augusta, ME ($295,000)
- Davidge Hall, University of Maryland, Baltimore, MD ($345,687)
- Great Brick Chapel, St. Mary’s City, MD ($197,535)
- Carey Building, New England Hospital for Women and Children, Boston, MA ($200,000)
- Center Tower Interior, Trinity Church, Boston, MA ($500,000)
- Gibson House Museum, Boston, MA ($250,000)
- Gore Place, Waltham, MA ($250,000)
- USS Massachusetts, Fall River, MA ($385,000)
- Isabella Stewart Gardner Museum, Boston, MA ($400,000)
- Conservation Treatment of the History of the Book in American Collection, American Antiquarian Society, Worcester, MA ( $100,000)
- Schooner Adventure, Gloucester, MA ($246,919)
- Emily Dickinson Homestead, Amherst, MA ($197,535)
- Anna Scripps Whitcomb Conservatory, Detroit, MI ($340,000)
- Goldenrod at the Henry Ford Museum, Dearborn, MI ($87,000)
- Artrain USA, Ann Arbor, MI ($148,152)
- A. E. Seaman Mineral Museum, Houghton, MI ($222,227)
- H. Alden Smith House, Minneapolis, MN ($197,535)
- Beauvoir, Mississippi Division, Sons of Confederate Veterans, Biloxi, MS ($300,000)
- Burns Church/Belfry House, Oxford, MS ($148,152)
- Marks-Rothenberg Building, Meridian, MS ($197,535)
- Pontotoc Courthouse, Pontotoc, MS ($296,303)
- Landers Theatre, Springfield, MO ($246,919)
- Martin Luther King, Jr. Memorial, Columbia, MO ($98,768)
- Ste. Genevieve Memorial Cemetery, Ste. Genevieve, MO ($148,152)
- Madison County Courthouse, Virginia City, MT ($246,919)
- Story Mansion, Bozeman, MT ($493,839)
- Walking Box Ranch, Clark County, NV ($271,611)
- The Music Hall, Portsmouth, NH ($395,071)
- Preserving Revolutionary War Documents, New Jersey Division of Archives and Records Management, Trenton, NJ ($347,000)
- Palace of the Governors Collections, Santa Fe, NM ($383,000)
- Picuris Old Village, Picuris Pueblo, Penasco, NM ($295,000)
- Camp Santanoni, Adirondack Architectural Heritage, Newcomb, NY ($365,000)
- Erie Canal Aqueduct at Schoharie Creek, Fort Hunter, NY ($365,000)
- The 9/11 Collection at the New York City Police Museum, New York, NY ($100,000)
- Bellevue Wall of Prayer, Museum of the City of New York, New York, NY ($135,000)
- Archives of the Martha Graham Dance Company, New York and Brooklyn, NY ($53,000)
- Records of America’s Dance Boom and the New York Public Library, New York, NY ($300,000)
- Television Collection at the Museum of Television and Radio, New York, NY ($300,000)
- 92nd Street Y Unterberg Poetry Center Audio Archive, New York, NY ($200,000)
- Meserve-Kunhardt Collection, Chappaqua, NY ($325,000)
- Conservation Treatment of the Revolutionary War Collection, New York State Archives and State Library, Albany, NY ($82,000)
- “Buffalo Bill” Billboard, Reg Lenna Center for the Arts, Jamestown, NY ($52,000)
- Council House Grounds, Letchworth State Park, Castile, NY ($98,768)
- Crotona Park Bath House, The Bronx, New York, NY ($98,768)
- Edgar Allan Poe Cottage, The Bronx, New York, NY ($98,768)
- Fitz-Greene Halleck House, Lake Ronkokoma, NY ($39,510)
- Graycliff, Derby, NY ($271,611)
- McVickar House, Irvington, NY ($197,535)
- Old Dutch Church, Kingston, NY ($98,768)
- Paramount Theater, Middletown, NY ($98,768)
- Rye Town Park Bath House, Rye, NY ($197,535)
- Wilderstein, Rhinebeck, NY ($148,152)
- Graveyard of the Atlantic Museum Collection, Hatteras, NC ($275,000)
- Hendersonville City Hall, Hendersonville, NC ($199,000)
- F.W. Woolworth Building, Greensboro, NC ($148,152)
- Single Sisters House, Salem College, Winston-Salem, NC ($197,535)
- French Gratitude Boxcar, Bismarck, ND ($79,016)
- Fort Abercrombie Historic Site, Fort Abercrombie, ND ($197,535)
- Fort Ancient Earthworks, Ohio Historical Society, Oregonia, OH ($255,000)
- Chester Academy, Chester, OH ($234,080)
- Haines House, Alliance, OH ($55,311)
- Hayesville Opera House, Hayesville, OH ($90,868)
- McKinley Museum, Canton, OH ($49,385)
- Ohio Theatre, Loudonville, OH ($24,694)
- Perry County Courthouse, Somerset, OH ($177,783)
- Fort Reno, El Reno, OK ($296,303)
- Astoria Column, Astoria, OR ($340,749)
- Mother Bethel AME Church, Philadelphia, PA ($500,000)
- The Woodlands, Philadelphia, PA ($200,000)
- Louis I. Kahn Collection at the University of Pennsylvania, Philadelphia, PA ($70,000)
- Louise Nevelson’s Atmosphere and Environment XII, Philadelphia, PA ($100,000)
- Conservation, Re-housing, and Digitization of Early 20th Century History of Science and Linguistics Manuscripts, American Philosophical Society, Philadelphia, PA ($164,000)
- Preservation Microfilm Duplication of Microfilmed Land Records, City of Philadelphia, PA ($51,000)
- Belmont Mansion, Philadelphia, PA ($197,535)
- Fallingwater, Bear Run, PA ($98,768)
- South Fork Fishing and Hunting Club, St. Michael, PA ($320,995)
- Old Main, Widener University, Chester, PA ($197,535)
- Hamilton Building, Pennsylvania Academy of Fine Arts, Philadelphia, PA ($197,535)
- Ramirez Solar House, Milford, PA ($246,919)
- Chateau-sur-Mer, Newport, RI ($250,000)
- The Providence Anthenaeum, Providence, RI ($260,000)
- Providence Performing Arts Center, Providence, RI ($271,611)
- Aiken-Rhett House, Charleston, SC ($225,000)
- Dock Street Theatre, Charleston, SC ($295,000)
- Benjamin Mays Birthplace, Greenwood, SC ($296,303)
- Camden Battlefield, Camden, SC ($296,303)
- Cheraw and Darlington Railroad Depot, Society Hill, SC ($74,076)
- Flipper Library, Columbia, SC ($197,535)
- Morris Island Lighthouse, Folly Beach, SC ($98,768)
- Old Marion High School, Marion, SC ($197,535)
- Homestake Opera House, Lead, SD ($370,379
- Rosenwald Negro Rural Schools Photograph Collection, Fisk University, Nashville, TN ($65,000)
- Bemis Auditorium, Bemis, TN ($197,535)
- Tennessee Theatre, Knoxville, TN ($46,423
- Hogg Family Collection, the Museum of Fine Arts, Houston, TX ($200,000)
- Plaza Theater, El Paso, TX ($197,535)
- Post Hospital, Fort Davis, TX ($200,000)
- Gray Building, Northfield, VT ($246,919)
- Adam Thoroughgood House, Virginia Beach, VA ($150,000)
- Woodrow Wilson Birthplace, Staunton, VA ($200,000)
- Buckland Historic District, Buckland, VA ($49,385)
- Lloyd House, Alexandria, VA ($98,768)
- Mansion House, McDowel, VA ($197,535)
- Jefferson County Courthouse, Port Townsend, WA ($385,000)
- Admiral Theatre, Bremerton, WA ($197,535)
- Fox Theater, Spokane, WA ($246,919
- Bethany College, Bethany, WV ($217,289)
- Old Post Office Arts Center, Martinsburg, WV ($98,768)
- Camp Washington-Carver, Cliff Top, WV ($148,152)
- Pendleton County Courthouse, Franklin, WV ($98,768
- Milwaukee Turner Hall Ballroom, Milwaukee, WI ($385,000)
- Oneida County Courthouse, Rhinelander, WI ($237,043)

==== 2005 ($29.5 million awarded) ====
- Bethel Baptist Church, Birmingham, AL ($215,000)
- Boligee Street Historic Preservation, AL ($400,000)
- Gaineswood, Demopolis, AL ($260,000)
- King Memorial Baptist Church, Montgomery, AL ($100,000)
- Somerville Courthouse, Somerville, AL ($95,000)
- Winston County Courthouse, Double Springs, AL ($95,000)
- 1934-1935 Alaska College Expedition Collection, Fairbanks, AK ($163,000)
- Alyeska Roundhouse, AK ($200,000)
- Japonski Island Boathouse, Sitka, AK ($325,000)
- Ansel Adams Collection, Tucson, AZ ($270,000)
- Anthropology Audio Visual Collection, Berkeley, CA ($180,000)
- Bodie Historic Mining District, Bridgeport, CA ($275,000)
- First Church of Christ, Berkeley, CA ($550,000)
- History of New American Music Preservation Project, Berkeley, CA ($180,000)
- El Garces Train Depot, Needles, CA ($200,000)
- Monterey Jazz Festival Audio Collection, Stanford, CA ($225,000)
- Pasadena Playhouse State Theatre of California, Pasadena, CA ($200,000)
- Ríos-Caledonia Adobe, Paso Robles, CA ($200,000)
- Old San Francisco Mint, San Francisco, CA $300,000)
- Elitch Gardens Theatre, Denver, CO ($300,000)
- First Congregational Church, CT ($300,000)
- Weir Farm, Wilton, CT ($147,916)
- Bellanca Air Service Hanger, DE ($300,000)
- Decatur House, Washington, D.C. ($100,000)
- The Octagon, Washington, D.C. ($225,000)
- Revolutionary War Orderly Books, Washington, D.C. ($67,000)
- Singing Tower at Bok Sanctuary, Lake Wales, FL ($450,000)
- AIDS Memorial Quilt, Atlanta, GA ($97,550 )
- Albany Theatre, GA ($150,000)
- Central of Georgia Railway’s Gray Building, Savannah, GA ($290,000)
- African American Archival Program, Morehouse College, Atlanta, GA ($100,000)
- Stewart County Courthouse, Lumpkin, GA ($125,000)
- Carlson Cottage, Chicago, IL ($250,000)
- Chicago Urban League Records, Chicago, IL ($100,000)
- Native American Archaeological Collection, Center for American Archeology, Kampsville, IL ($325,000)
- Orpheum Theatre, Champaign, IL ($250,000)
- Vehicle Collection of Studebaker National Museum, South Bend, IN ($168,900)
- Hoyt Sherman Place Theater, IA ($300,000)
- Behringer-Crawford Museum collections, Devou Park, Covington, KY ($100,000)
- Jefferson Community College, Louisville, KY ($100,000)
- Old Warren County Courthouse, Bowling Green, KY ($250,000)
- Linden Project, Prince Frederick, MD ($250,000)
- MD House at the Baltimore Zoo, Baltimore, MD ($350,000)
- Mount Royal Station and Train Shed, Baltimore, MD ($360,000)
- Captain Robert Bennet Forbes House, Milton, MA ($75,000)
- Hamilton Manufacturing Co. Courthouse and Storehouse, Lowell, MA ($250,000)
- Early American Newspaper Collection, Worcester, MA ($60,000)
- Acetate Negative Collection, Stockbridge, MA ($296,500)
- Thomas Sully’s The Passage of the Delaware, Boston, MA ($144,000)
- New Salem Academy, New Salem, MA ($175,000)
- Early American Schoolbook Collection, East Lansing, MI ($127,249)
- Civil War Monument, Grand Traverse, MI ($30,000)
- Duluth National Guard Armory, Duluth, MN ($250,000)
- James J. Hill House, St. Paul, MN ($250,000)
- Turnblad Mansion, MN ($200,000)
- Clarke County Courthouse, MS ($200,000)
- WLBT News Film Collection, Jackson, MS ($227,000)
- Lafayette County Courthouse, MS ($200,000)
- Arthur Simmons Stables Historic District, Mexico, MO ($250,000)
- City of Springfield City Hall, MO ($300,000)
- Historic Rock Carvings, Billings, MT ($65,400)
- Union Pacific Dining Lodge, MT ($400,000)
- Lear Theater, Reno, NV ($400,000)
- Oats Park School/Arts Center, Fallon, NV ($200,000)
- Old Meadow Bridge, Shelburne, NH ($220,000)
- Currier Museum of Art, Manchester, NH ($108,472)
- Church of the Presidents, Long Branch, NJ ($100,000)
- Henry Phillips Farmhouse, Union County, NJ ($150,000)
- Nicholson House, NJ ($150,000)
- Fort Stanton Administration Building, Fort Stanton, NM ($210,000)
- Alvin Ailey American Dance Theater Archives, New York, NY ($132,000)
- Stanford White Complex, Bronx Community College, New York, NY ($200,000)
- Broome County YWCA, Binghamton, NY ($100,000)
- Clinton House, Ithaca, NY ($100,000)
- Dragon Rock, Manitoga, Garrison, NY ($250,000)
- Gardner Earl Memorial Chapel and Crematorium, Oakwood Cemetery, Troy, NY ($250,000)
- Goodwill Theatre, Johnson City, NY ($50,000)
- H. G. Hotchkiss Essential Oil Company Plant, Lyons, NY ($200,000)
- Native American Collection, Huntington Free Library and Reading Room, New York, NY ($250,000)
- Merce Cunningham Dance Archives, New York, NY ($225,000)
- Historic Architecture Protection, Ossining, NY ($150,000)
- Paul Taylor Dance Archives, New York, NY ($80,475)
- Rye Meeting House, Rye, NY ($50,000)
- Playland Amusement Park, Rye, NY ($500,000)
- Sonnenberg Mansion, Canandaigua, NY ($370,000)
- Universal Preservation Hall, Saratoga Springs, NY ($200,000)
- Grove Arcade, Asheville, NC ($500,000)
- Harper House, Bentonsville, NC ($100,000)
- Penland School of Craft, Penland, NC ($100,000)
- Tryon Palace, New Bern, NC ($150,000)
- Wilkes Courthouse, Wilkesboro, NC ($200,000)
- Cold War sites, ND ($250,000)
- Fort Seward Military Post, Jamestown, ND ($100,000)
- Hutmacher Farm, Manning, ND ($100,000)
- Dennison Railroad Depot Museum, Dennison, OH ($200,000)
- Holland Theater, Bellefontaine, OH ($200,000)
- Smith-Orr House, OH ($98,611)
- Howe House, OH ($100,000)
- Joan Miro and Saul Steinberg Murals, Cincinnati, OH ($135,250)
- University Hall, Ohio Wesleyan, Delaware, OH ($50,000)
- Old Post Office, Sandusky, OH ($200,000)
- Stan Hywet Hall, Akron, OH ($250,000)
- Westcott House, Springfield, OH ($200,000)
- W.P. Snyder, Jr. Steam Towboat, Marietta, OH ($350,000)
- Native American Ledger Art, Norman, OK ($100,000)
- Vincent Maragliotti Ceilings in the Marland Mansion, Ponca City, OK ($180,000)
- Eric Ladd Cast Iron Collection, Portland, OR ($295,832)
- Historic Iron Smelter, Lake Oswego, OR ($100,000)
- Church of the Advocate, Philadelphia, PA ($500,000)
- Drake Oil Well, Titusville, PA ($150,000)
- Founder’s Hall at Girard College, Philadelphia, PA ($544,554)
- Harmony Engine Company Firehouse, PA ($200,000)
- Johnson House, Philadelphia, PA ($275,000)
- Moravian College Brethren House, Bethlehem, PA ($150,000)
- Pearl S. Buck House, Perkasie, PA ($450,000)
- Pennsylvania Civil War Muster Rolls, Harrisburg, PA ($375,000)
- Pennsylvania General Assembly Collection, Harrisburg, PA ($250,000)
- Rowland Theater, Phillipsburg, PA ($98,611)
- Troy High School, PA ($250,000)
- Vertebrate Paleontology Collection, Pittsburgh, PA ($450,000)
- Washington and Jefferson College Historic Buildings, Washington, PA ($300,000)
- Pawtucket Public Library, Pawtucket, RI ($300,000)
- Beaufort Arsenal, Beaufort, SC ($230,000)
- H. L. Hunley Submarine, Charleston, SC ($100,000)
- Old Exchange and Provost, Charleston, SC ($250,000)
- Oscar Howe Murals (Mobridge School District), SD ($150,000)
- Moore County Courthouse, Lynchburg, TN ($50,000)
- Carlo Ciampaglia Murals at Fair Park, Dallas, TX ($300,000)
- Sam Rayburn Library and Museum, Austin, TX ($200,000)
- Socorro Mission, El Paso, TX ($200,000)
- Ancestral Puebloan Sites, Monticello, UT ($2,225,000)
- Town Hall Theater, Middlebury, VT ($150,000)
- Buckland Preservation, VA ($50,000)
- Robert Dinwiddie Papers, Virginia Museum of History and Culture, Richmond, VA ($78,289)
- Pope-Leighey House, Alexandria, VA ($49,305)
- Lee-Fendall House, Old Town Alexandria, VA ($75,000)
- Northern Virginia Freedom House, Alexandria, VA ($75,000)
- Phoenix Bank of Nansemond, Suffolk, VA ($100,000)
- Stabler-Leadbeater Apothecary Museum, Alexandria, VA ($50,000)
- Bremerton Building 50 Naval Museum, Bremerton, WA ($300,000)
- Hazlett-Fields House, Wheeling, WV ($250,000)
- Boys’ Dormitory, Government Boarding School, Lac du Flambeau, WI ($275,000)
- Yawkey House, Wausau, WI ($250,000)
- David T. Vernon Collection, Grand Teton National Park, Moose, WY ($100,000)

==== 2006 ($7.6 million awarded, 42 projects) ====
- Sixteenth Street Baptist Church, Birmingham, AL ($400,000)
- Archaeological, Botany, and Zoological Collections of the Colorado Plateau, Museum of Northern Arizona, Flagstaff, AZ ($250,000)
- Centennial Baptist Church, E. C. Morris Foundation, Helena-West-Helena, AR ($300,000)
- Alcatraz Island Gardens, Golden Gate National Parks Conservancy, San Francisco Bay, CA ($250,048)
- Hearst Metrotone Newsreel Collection, UCLA Film and Television Archive, Hollywood, CA ($200,000)
- Georgetown Schoolhouse, Georgetown Trust for Conservation and Preservation Inc., Georgetown, CO ($150,000)
- Clyfford Still Collection, Clyfford Still Museum, Denver, CO ($150,000)
- The Corcoran Gallery of Art, Washington, DC ($250,000)
- Farnsworth House, Landmarks Preservation Council of Illinois, Plano, IL ($137,630)
- The Three Arts Club, The Three Arts Club of Chicago, Chicago, IL ($100,000)
- Video Archives, The Joffrey Ballet, Chicago, IL ($75,000)
- Terrace Hill, Terrace Hill Foundation, Des Moines, IA ($150,000)
- Fort Jackson Artifacts, Plaquemines Parish Government, Buras, LA ($125,000)
- Skipjack Nellie L. Byrd, Chesapeake Bay Memories Charities, Inc., Middle River, MD ($94,000)
- Col. James Barrett Farm, Save Our Heritage, Concord, MA ($220,000)
- United First Parish Church, United First Church (Unitarian), Quincy, MA ($100,000)
- Americana Collection, Norman B. Leventhal Map Center, Boston Public Library, Boston, MA ($135,000)
- Boston Common Collection, Boston Parks and Recreation Department, Boston, MA ($200,000)
- Fair Lane, The University of Michigan-Dearborn, Dearborn, MI ($350,000)
- Fort Snelling Upper Bluffs, Hennepin County, Hennepin, MN ($150,000)
- Working Office of Harry S. Truman, The Harry S. Truman Institute for National and International Affairs, Independence, MO ($125,000)
- Native American Collection, Nebraska State Historical Society, Lincoln, NE ($170,000)
- The Factory Building at Speedwell Village, Morris County Park Commission, Morristown, NJ ($325,000)
- Midmer-Losh Pipe Organ at Atlantic City Convention Hall, New Jersey Sports and Exposition Authority, Atlantic City, NJ ($100,000)
- Saint Augustine Church, Pueblo of Isleta, Isleta, NM ($150,000)
- 101 Spring Street, Judd Foundation, New York, NY ($200,000)
- World Trade Center/September 11, 2001 Collection, New York State Museum, Albany, NY ($128,683)
- Van Rensselaer Manor Papers, New York State Library, Albany, NY ($58,000)
- Christ Church, Christ Church Preservation Trust, Philadelphia, PA ($350,000)
- The Pine Building, Pennsylvania Hospital, Philadelphia, PA ($350,000)
- "Battle of Gettysburg" Cyclorama Painting, Gettysburg Foundation, Gettysburg, PA ($200,000)
- Sol Feinstone Collection, The David Library of the American Revolution, Washington Crossing, PA ($60,000)
- Tennessee Valley Authority Archaeological Collections, University of Tennessee, Knoxville, TN ($100,000)
- First National Bank Building, Galveston Arts Center, Inc., Galveston, TX ($250,000)
- St. Luke's Church, Historic St. Luke's Restoration, Inc., Smithfield, VA ($250,000)
- Archaeological and Architectural Collections, Colonial Williamsburg Foundation, Williamsburg, VA ($200,000)
- Costume Collection, James Monroe Museum & Memorial Library, Fredericksburg, VA ($26,262)
- Collections, Orcas Island Historical Museum, Eastsound, WA ($100,000)
- American System-Built Home Model B-1, Frank Lloyd Wright Wisconsin Heritage Tourism Program, Milwaukee, WI ($150,000)
- Sheridan Inn, Sheridan Heritage Center, Inc., Sheridan, WY ($350,000)

==== 2007 ($7.6 million awarded) ====
- Erskine House, Kodiak Historical Society, AK ($273,750)
- Mendocino Woodlands Recreational Demonstration Area, Mendocino Woodlands State Park, Mendocino Woodlands Camp Association, CA ($400,000)
- The California Building, Museum of Us, San Diego, CA ($300,000)
- Denver and Rio Grande Western Railroad Steam Locomotive 463, Cumbres and Toltec Scenic Railroad Commission, CO ($300,000)
- Read House and Gardens, Historical Society of Delaware, New Castle, DE ($400,000)
- Outdoor Sculpture Collection, Vizcaya Museum and Gardens, Miami, FL ($300,000)
- Fort James Jackson, Coastal Heritage Society, GA ($300,000)
- Cataldo Mission, Coeur d'Alene's Old Mission State Park, Idaho Department of Parks and Recreation, ID ($220,000)
- American Botanical Heritage Collection, Chicago Botanic Garden, IL ($55,911)
- North Christian Church, Columbus, IN ($300,000)
- 1896 Kimball Pipe Organ, Union Sunday School, State Historical Society of Iowa, Clermont, IA ($50,000)
- Dubuque County Jail, Dubuque, IA ($125,000)
- USS Constellation, USS Constellation Museum, Baltimore, MD ($173,702)
- Beauport/Sleeper-McCann House, Historic New England, Gloucester, MA ($500,000)
- Schooner Ernestina, Massachusetts Department of Conservation and Recreation, New Bedford, MA ($500,000)
- Recorded Sound Collection, Detroit Symphony Orchestra, Detroit, MI ($150,000)
- Old Mississippi State Capitol, Mississippi Department of Archives and History, Jackson, MS ($525,000)
- St. Mary's in the Mountains Catholic Church, The Roman Catholic Bishop of Reno and his Successors, Virginia City, NV ($500,000)
- Four Dances Choreographed by Martha Graham, Dance Notation Bureau, NY ($94,993)
- New York Philharmonic Leonard Bernstein Collection, The Philharmonic-Symphony Society of New York, Inc., NY ($175,000)
- Southworth and Hawes Daguerreotype Collection, George Eastman House, Rochester, NY ($250,000)
- Race Street Meetinghouse, Friends Center Corporation, Philadelphia, PA ($325,181)
- John Brown House, Rhode Island Historical Society, Providence, RI ($243,000)
- Holy Cross Episcopal Church, Church of the Holy Cross, Stateburg, SC ($250,000)
- Abraham Lincoln Library and Museum, Lincoln Memorial University, Harrogate, TN ($29,025)
- Reverend L. O. Taylor Collection, Center for Southern Folklore, Memphis, TN ($210,951)
- Ashton Villa/James Moreau Brown House, Galveston Historical Foundation, Galveston, TX ($150,000)
- Austin Papers, University of Texas at Austin, TX ($173,930)
- J. Alden Weir Collection, Brigham Young University Museum of Art, Provo, UT ($120,000)
- Papers of John Randolph of Roanoke and Special Collections, University of Virginia, VA ($49,557)
- Fort Nisqually Museum Collection, Fort Nisqually Granary and Factor's House, Metropolitan Park District of Tacoma, DuPont, WA ($130,000)

==== 2008 ($10.52 million awarded) ====
- Bullock County Courthouse, Bullock County Development Authority, AL ($295,000)
- Cahaba, Old Cahawba Center, Alabama Historical Commission, AL ($172,000)
- Church of the Assumption of the Virgin Mary, Holy Assumption Orthodox Church, Russian Orthodox Sacred Sites in Alaska, Kenai, AK ($125,492)
- George Washington Carver High School, George Washington Carver Museum and Cultural Center, Phoenix, AZ ($295,000)
- Clover Bend Historic District, Clover Bend Historical Preservation Association, Clover Bend, AR ($98,000)
- Lane House Theater, Main Stage Creative Community Center, Eureka Springs, AR ($148,000)
- Planning for Preservation and Tourism in Arkansas, Arkansas Historic Preservation Program, AR ($100,000)
- Casa Grande, Santa Clara County Parks and Recreation Department, CA ($98,000)
- Maritime Child Development Center, Rosie the Riveter Trust, Richmond, CA ($98,000)
- San Luis Rey Mission Church, California Missions Foundation, CA ($640,000)
- Oroville Historic State Theater Renovations, Department of Public Works, City of Oroville, CA ($197,000)
- San Francisco Examiner Photograph Archive, Bancroft Library, University of California, CA ($158,278)
- Chimney Rock Archeological Site, Chimney Rock Pueblo, Chimney Rock Interpretive Association, CO ($241,000)
- Masonic Hall and Grand Theater, Grand Opera House, Wilmington, DE ($246,000)
- Howard Theatre, Ellis Development Group, Washington, D.C. ($421,600)
- St. John's Church, Vestry of St. John's Parish, Washington, D.C. ($200,000)
- Sewall-Belmont House National Historic Site, National Woman's Party, Washington, D.C. ($81,437)
- Annie Pfeiffer Chapel, Florida Southern College, FL ($350,000)
- Fort Desoto Batteries, Fort DeSoto Park, Pinellas County, FL ($246,000)
- Glen Mary Plantation, Preservation America Trust, Hancock County, GA ($295,000)
- Green-Meldrim House, St. John's Church, Savannah, GA ($400,000)
- Candler Library Building, Hightower Hall Dormitory, and Olive Swann Porter Building, Wesleyan College Historic District, Wesleyan College, GA ($98,000)
- Fanny Call House, Hatch House, Livery Barn, McClellan Cabin, Meetinghouse, and Muir House and Store, Chesterfield Historic District, Chesterfield Foundation, ID ($295,000)
- Historic Wilson Theater, City of Rupert, ID ($197,000)
- Alumni Hall, Knox College, Galesburg, IL (296,000)
- Rosenthal Archives Collections, Chicago Symphony Orchestra, Chicago, IL ($65,105)
- Scottish Rite Temple (now called the Bloomington Center for the Performing Arts), Bloomington Cultural District, IL ($173,000)
- Unity Temple, Unity Temple Restoration Foundation, Oak Park, IL ($200,000)
- City National Bank Building, Wright on the Park, Mason City, IA ($394,000)
- Butler County Courthouse, El Dorado, KS ($296,000)
- W. P. Brown Mansion, Coffeyville Historical Society, Coffeyville, KS ($221,000)
- Pine Mountain Settlement School, Harlan County, KY ($138,575)
- Maine Maritime Museum, Bath, ME ($460,000)
- Lloyd Street Synagogue, Jewish Museum of Maryland, Baltimore, MD ($123,000)
- Poplar Hill on His Lordship's Kindness, Clinton, MD ($158,000)
- Rackliffe Plantation House, Rackliffe House Trust, MD ($98,000)
- Rescuing the B&O's Iron Horses, Baltimore and Ohio Transportation Museum and Mount Clare Station, B&O Railroad Museum, Inc., MD ($500,000)
- Steam Tug Baltimore, Baltimore Museum of Industry, MD ($250,000)
- Public 1963 March on Washington Radio Broadcast, WGBH Educational Foundation, Boston, MA ($72,120)
- William Cullen Bryant Homestead, The Trustees of Reservations, Cummington, MA ($148,000)
- Marquette Harbor Light, Marquette Maritime Museum, Marquette, MI ($201,425)
- NAPC 2009 Forum, City of Grand Rapids, MI ($23,000)
- U.S. Weather Bureau Building, Soo Locks Park, Great Lakes Shipwreck Historical Society, MI ($125,640)
- Historic Battle Flag Restoration Project, Minnesota Historical Society, MN ($181,119)
- Ripley Memorial Hospital, Aeon, MN ($295,000)
- Curlee House/Verandah House, City of Corinth, MS ($148,000)
- Dockery Farms Historic District, Dockery Farms Foundation, MS ($177,244)
- Immanuel Episcopal Church, Friends of Immanuel, MS ($148,000)
- Walthall County Courthouse and Jail, MS ($197,000)
- Missouri Theatre, Missouri Symphony Society, Columbia, MO ($493,000)
- New Letters on the Air: Imperiled Voices, University of Missouri, on behalf of UMKC, MO ($68,505)
- Griffith House, Kepler’s Cabin, Meade Hotel, and Parsonage, Bannack Building Stabilization, Montana Fish, Wildlife and Parks, MT ($194,593)
- Curtis and Ish Building and Goldfield High School, Goldfield Historic District, Goldfield Historical Society, NV ($296,000)
- Littleton Opera House, Town of Littleton, NH ($493,000)
- Santa Maria El Mirador, NM ($148,000)
- Mission Nuestra Senora de Guadalupe de Zuni, Pueblo of Zuni, NM ($98,000)
- Colonial Niagara Historic District, Old Fort Niagara Preservation, Old Fort Niagara Association, Inc., NY ($240,000)
- Whiteside, Barnett and Co. Agricultural Works, Clinton Street District, Village of Brockport, NY ($365,000)
- DuPont-Guest Estate, de Seversky Center Building, New York Institute of Technology, Brookville, NY ($148,000)
- Maverick Concert Hall, Maverick Concerts, Inc., Hurley, NY ($148,000)
- McKim, Mead and White Collection, New-York Historical Society, New York, NY (180,693)
- Mordecai Sheftall Papers: Conservation, Preservation, and Digitization, American Jewish Historical Society, New York, NY ($48,946)
- Mount Hope Cemetery, City of Rochester, NY ($98,000)
- Poughkeepsie-Highland Railroad Bridge, The Poughkeepsie-Highland Railroad Bridge Co., Inc., NY ($440,000)
- Seneca Knitting Mill, National Women's Hall of Fame, Seneca Falls, NY ($246,000)
- Library Stabilization Project, New York Academy of Medicine, New York, NY ($500,000)
- Thomas Moran House and Garden, Thomas Moran Trust, Inc., East Hampton, NY ($596,600)
- Cupola House, Cupola House Association, Edenton, NC ($115,000)
- Fire Fighters' Hall, Toledo and Ohio Central Railroad Station, Columbus Fire Fighters Union, Franklinton, OH ($98,000)
- Garage, Main House, Milk House, Smokehouse, Spring House, and Wool House, Spring Hill Historic Home, Massillon, OH ($90,000)
- Lake Dam, Wintersmith Park Historic District, City of Ada, OK ($246,000)
- Archives, Tulsa Foundation for Architecture, OK ($150,000)
- Eastern State Penitentiary, Eastern State Penitentiary Historic Site, Inc., Philadelphia, PA ($595,163)
- Embassy Theatre, Friends of the Embassy Theatre, Lewistown, PA ($246,000)
- Henry Melchior Muhlenberg Journal Collection, Lutheran Archives Center at Philadelphia, PA ($93,191)
- Payne Gallery, Moravian College, Bethlehem, PA ($148,000)
- Philadelphia Museum of Art, Philadelphia, PA ($98,000)
- Pittsburgh Courier Historic Archives, New Pittsburgh Courier, PA ($148,000)
- Submarine USS Becuna (SS-319), Independence Seaport Museum, Philadelphia, PA ($125,000)
- 19th Century Documents, Valley Forge Archives and Collections, Valley Forge National Historical Park, PA ($61,299)
- W. A. Young and Sons Foundry and Machine Shop, Rivers of Steel National Heritage Area, Steel Industry Heritage Corporation, PA ($148,000)
- Channing Memorial Church, Newport, RI ($440,000)
- Methodist Church, Rhode Island Historical Society, RI ($295,000)
- Old Slater Mill, Old Slater Mill Association, Pawtucket, RI ($300,000)
- Carnegie Public Library, City of Darlington, SC ($148,000)
- Goodwill Parochial School, Goodwill Educational and Historical Society, Mayesville, SC ($98,000)
- Woodrow Wilson Boyhood Home, Historic Columbia Foundation, Columbia, SC ($335,000)
- Days of '76 Museum Collections, Clowser Collection, Days of '76 Museum, Inc., SC ($272,700)
- Grand Opera House, Dell Rapids Society for Historical Preservation, SD ($246,000)
- Bishop's Palace / Walter Gresham House, Galveston Historical Foundation, Galveston, TX ($371,600)
- Knights of Pythias Building, Chisholm Trail Heritage Museum, Inc., Cuero, TX ($345,000)
- Anthropology Collections Care and Rehousing Project, University of Utah, Salt Lake City, UT ($500,000)
- B-29 Bombers Hangar, Enola Gay Hangar, Historic Wendover Airfield, Wendover, UT ($511,600)
- Gadsby's Ice Well, Gadsby's Tavern Museum, City of Alexandria, VA ($49,000)
- Henry County Courthouse, Martinsville-Henry County Historical Society, VA ($98,000)
- Jamestown Rediscovery Archaeological Collection, Association for the Preservation of Virginia Antiquities, VA ($137,500)
- Lee-Fendall House Museum and Garden, Alexandria, VA ($98,000)
- Bethel Town Hall, Bethel, VT ($301,000)
- Admiral Theatre, Admiral Theatre Foundation, Seattle, WA ($246,000)
- Andrews Methodist Church, Mother's Day Shrine, City of Grafton, WV ($123,000)
- Wetzel County Courthouse, WV ($138,000)
- Paul Dyck Plains Indian Buffalo Culture Collection, Buffalo Bill Memorial Association, Cody, WY ($350,000)

=== Michelle Obama, Honorary Chair ===
==== 2009 ($9.5 million awarded) ====
- Episcopal Church of the Nativity, Huntsville, AL ($432,216)
- Kolmakovsky Redoubt Collection, University of Alaska Fairbanks, Fairbanks, AK ($75,000)
- Hollyhock House, Los Angeles, CA ($489,000)
- Denver Museum of Nature & Science Anthropology Collection, Denver, CO ($324,385)
- Old Naval Hospital, Washington, D.C. ($150,000)
- Smithsonian Archives of American Art Oral History Collection, Washington, D.C. ($250,000)
- Smithsonian National Anthropological Archives, Washington, D.C. ($323,000)
- Carrère and Hastings Architectural Collection, Flagler College, St. Augustine, FL ($49,562)
- Oakland Cemetery, Atlanta, GA ($200,000)
- Kilauea Point Lighthouse, Kauai, HI ($257,713)
- The Museum of Science and Industry, Chicago, IL ($400,000)
- New Orleans Museum of Art, New Orleans, LA ($300,000)
- Jacob’s Pillow Dance Festival Collection, Jacob’s Pillow, Becket, MA ($59,000)
- Faneuil Hall Art Collection, Boston, MA ($200,000)
- Frederick Ayer Mansion, Boston, MA ($400,000)
- Old Ship Meeting House, Hingham, MA ($300,000)
- “This I Believe” Collection, Tufts University, Medford, MA ($58,783)
- Hammond-Harwood House, Annapolis, MD ($210,000)
- Homewood Museum, Baltimore, MD ($186,880)
- Moving Panorama of Pilgrim’s Progress, Saco, ME ($51,940)
- Schooner J. & E. Riggin, Rockland, ME ($300,000)
- Christ Church Lutheran, Minneapolis, MN ($160,000)
- San Miguel Chapel, Santa Fe, NM ($200,000)
- Franklin D. Roosevelt’s Study, Oval Office and White House Collections, Hyde Park, NY ($200,000)
- North Family Great Stone Barn, Mount Lebanon Shaker Society, Mount Lebanon, NY ($400,000)
- The Last Column, National September 11 Memorial and Museum, New York, NY ($200,000)
- Post-World War II Television Documentary Collection, Paley Center for Media, New York, NY ($104,924)
- Raíces Latin Music Collection, New York, NY ($75,000)
- Allan Herschell Company Factory Building, North Tonawonda, NY ($265,000)
- Everson Museum of Art Video Collection, Syracuse, NY ($25,000)
- Cherokee National Capitol Building, Catoossa, OK ($150,000)
- Friendly Association for Regaining and Preserving Peace with the Indians by Pacific Measure Papers, Haverford College, Haverford, PA ($31,065)
- Civil War Museum of Philadelphia, Philadelphia, PA ($150,000)
- William Still Collection of Papers, Photographs, and Abolitionist Pamphlets, Temple University, Philadelphia, PA ($46,770)
- Romare Bearden’s Mural “Pittsburgh Recollections”, Gateway Station, Pittsburgh, PA ($100,000)
- Fortín de San Gerónimo de Boquerón, San Juan, PR ($300,000)
- Stanford White Casino Theatre, Newport Casino, Newport, RI ($400,000)
- Unitarian Church, Charleston, SC ($200,000)
- Shelburne Museum, Shelburne, VT ($600,000)
- Chapel Car 5 Messenger of Peace, Northwest Railway Museum, Snoqualmie, WA ($180,000)
- American System-Built Home, Model, Milwaukee, WI ($393,762)

==== 2010 ( $14.3 million awarded) ====
- Saving Woven Wonders of American Heritage, Arizona State Museum at the University of Arizona, Tucson, AZ ($400,000)
- Dendrochronology Collection, Laboratory of Tree-Ring Research, University of Arizona, Tucson, AZ ($425,000)
- Civil War Battle Flag Collection, Old State House, Little Rock, AR ($26,032)
- Hans Hofmann Paintings, Berkeley Art Museum, Berkeley, CA ($93,825)
- Bringing Back the Americans: Saving Lost Silent Films, National Film Preservation Foundation, San Francisco, CA ($203,000)
- Pier 2 building, Fort Mason, San Francisco, CA ($700,000)
- SS Red Oak Victory, Richmond, CA ($700,000)
- Barnum and London Circus Posters, Bridgeport Public Library, Bridgeport, CT ($26,703)
- 19th-Century Dinosaur Collections of Othniel Charles Marsh, Yale Peabody Museum of Natural History, New Haven, CT ($450,000)
- Philadelphia Savings Fund Society building, Howe and Lescaze Design Archives, Hagley Museum and Library, New Castle, DE ($26,305)
- Washington National Cathedral, Washington, DC ($700,000)
- Heye Foundation Collection, National Museum of the American Indian, Washington, D.C. ($29,905)
- Jim Crow Railroad Car, National Museum of African American History and Culture, Washington, D.C. ($222,128)
- Renwick Gallery, Washington, D.C. ($335,000)
- Moses and Frances Asch Collection, Center for Folklife and Cultural Heritage, Washington, D.C. ($335,500)
- Dance Theater of Harlem Archives, Dance Heritage Coalition, Washington, D.C. ($58,853)
- Biodiversity Field Books and Expedition Journals, National Museum of Natural History, Washington, D.C. ($96,783)
- African-American Scrapbooks, Emory University, Atlanta, GA ($170,000)
- Flannery O'Connor's Andalusia Hill House, Milledgeville, GA ($120,000)
- Steeple Building, Bishop Hill, IL ($312,560)
- R. Buckminster Fuller and Anne Hewlett Dome Home, Carbondale, IL ($125,000)
- Jane Addams Hull-House Museum, Chicago, IL ($80,000)
- 1992 Election Documentary Collection, Innovative TV, Chicago, IL ($79,000)
- Butler Fieldhouse, Butler University, Indianapolis, IN ($700,000)
- USS LST 325, Evansville, IN ($414,444)
- Haystack Mountain School of Crafts, Deer Isle, ME ($125,000)
- Hessian Barracks, Frederick, MD ($259,800)
- Jacqueline Bouvier Kennedy Collection, John F. Kennedy Library, Boston, MA ($150,000)
- Historic Alaska Native Kayaks and Related Collections, Harvard University Peabody Museum and the Alutiiq Museum and Archaeological Repository, Cambridge, MA ($283,685)
- Norman Rockwell's Works on Paper, Illustrated Posters and Photographs, Norman Rockwell Museum, Stockbridge, MA ($144,240)
- Reserve and Early American Bindings Collection, American Antiquarian Society, Worcester, MA ($77,557)
- Civil Rights Collections, Tougaloo College, Tougaloo, MS ($213,564)
- A.B. Nichols Panama Canal Collection, Linda Hall Library of Science, Engineering & Technology, Kansas City, MO ($52,929)
- Patee House, St. Joseph, MO ($162,500)
- Perimeter Wall, Missouri Botanical Garden, St. Louis, MO ($529,623)
- Butte Mineyard Headframes, Butte, MT ($192,000)
- Ardis and Robert James Collection, University of Nebraska–Lincoln, Lincoln, NE ($25,000)
- Acoma Pueblo, Acoma, NM ($216,491)
- Museum of Indian Arts and Culture, Santa Fe, NM ($550,000)
- Trinity Church, Buffalo, NY ($178,615)
- Trials Pamphlet Collection, Cornell University Library, Ithaca, NY ($155,700)
- Fireboat John J. Harvey, New York, NY ($165,955)
- New York City Ballet Film Archives, New York, NY ($75,000)
- Robert and Cornell Capa Collections, International Center of Photography, New York, NY ($57,425)
- Gordon Parks Collection, Meserve-Kunhardt Foundation, Pleasantville, NY ($69,008)
- Edison Tinfoil Recording, Schenectady Museum Association, Schenectady, NY ($25,735)
- Calvert Vaux Hoyt House, Staatsburg, NY ($320,000)
- Reptile House, Cincinnati Zoo, Cincinnati, OH ($408,886)
- Pennsylvania German Fraktur Collection, Berman Museum of Art at Ursinus College, Collegeville, PA ($31,000)
- Central Market, Lancaster, PA ($300,000)
- St. Mark's Episcopal Church, Philadelphia, PA ($700,000)
- Pennsylvania German Manuscripts, Free Library of Philadelphia, Philadelphia, PA ($200,000)
- Rabbi Mordecai M. Kaplan Collection, Reconstructionist Rabbinical College, Wyncote, PA ($25,250)
- Yaughan and Curriboo Archaeological Collections, Columbia, SC ($192,482)
- Historical Photographs from the US-Mexico Border, University of Texas at El Paso, El Paso, TX ($141,206)
- Trevino-Uribe Rancho, San Ignacio, TX ($269,130)
- Arlington House, the Robert E. Lee Memorial, Arlington, VA ($290,000)
- September 11 Digital Archive, George Mason University, Fairfax, VA ($152,769)
- Executive Papers and Letterbooks of Governor Thomas Jefferson, Library of Virginia, Richmond, VA ($110,000)
- Charles Hoffbauer "Memorial Military" Murals, Richmond, VA ($375,000)
- 1889 Soldiers Home Chapel and Chaplain's Quarters, National Soldiers Home Historical District, Milwaukee, WI ($245,412)

=== No Honorary Chair publicly designated ===
==== 2017 ($4.8 million awarded) ====
- Conserving Photographic Media Documenting 13,000 Years of Indigenous Heritage in the Southwest, Arizona Board of Regents, AZ ($500,000)
- Restoration of the Joseph Pleasants Stone Building at the Modjeska Historic House and Gardens, Orange County Parks, CA ($153,016)
- Archival conservation of collections of the Women’s Building, J. Paul Getty Trust, Los Angeles, CA ($284,400)
- Preservation of the Tabor Opera House in Leadville, City of Leadville, CO ($500,000)
- Rehabilitation of the National Historic Landmark 1921 Fishing Schooner L.A. Dunton, Mystic Seaport Museum, CT ($491,750)
- Conservation of Rosenfeld Collection of Maritime Photography Recovery Project, Mystic Seaport Museum, CT ($244,417)
- Curating Angel Mounds Legacy Collection, Trustees of Indiana University, IN ($300,590)
- Conserving the Decorative Paintings in Victoria Mansion’s parlor, Victoria Mansion, ME ($132,050)
- Arlington Street Church Portico Preservation, Foundation for the Preservation of 20 Arlington Street, Inc., MA ($500,000)
- Restoration of Grace Methodist Church in Virginia City, Montana Department of Commerce, MT ($200,000)
- Rehabilitation of Saint Paul the Prospector Church in Virginia City, Western Missionary Museum Corporation, NV ($153,017)
- Stabilization and Conservation of Great Camp Santanoni’s Main Lodge, Adirondack Architectural Heritage, NY ($370,000)
- Revolutionary War and New York Loyalists Collection, New York State Archives Partnership Trust, NY ($125,760)
- Restoration of Lake View Cemetery: James A. Garfield Memorial, Lake View Cemetery Foundation, OH ($500,000)
- Conservation of Significant Works Progress Administration Art Collection of the Timberline Lodge, Friends of Timberline, OR ($25,000)
- Taliesin-Hillside Theater Restoration, Frank Lloyd Wright Foundation, WI ($320,000)

==== 2018 ($12.6 million awarded) ====
- Kobuk River Collection Rehousing and Stabilization, University of Alaska Fairbanks, Fairbanks, AK ($119,585)
- Conservation of The Hawk for Peace, a Stabile by Alexander Calder, Regents of the University of California, Berkeley, CA ($109,576)
- Restoration of Residence A at the Aline Barnsdall Complex, Project Restore, Los Angeles, CA ($500,000)
- Repair of the First Theater in Monterey, Monterey State Historic Park Association, Monterey, CA ($194,360)
- Restoration of the Botanical Building Welcome Gallery, Balboa Park Conservancy, San Diego, CA ($257,668)
- Conservation of the Lost New Deal Frescos of San Francisco's Art Institute, San Francisco Art Institute, San Francisco, CA ($94,000)
- Conservation of Museum Panoramic and Oversized Photographs, Pro Rodeo Hall of Fame and Museum of the American Cowboy, Colorado Springs, CO ($95,500)
- Saving Sound recordings from Alexander Graham Bell's Volta Laboratory, Smithsonian Institution, Washington, D.C. ($488,150)
- Conservation of Artifacts and Records from 17th Century Franciscan Mission Site of San Juan del Puerto, University of Florida, Gainesville, FL ($94,734)
- Conservation of the Wasden Archeological Collection Representing 15,000 Years of Native American Occupation on the Snake River Plain, Museum of Idaho, Idaho Falls, ID ($172,103)
- Upper South Amana Hotel Restoration, Amana Colonies Historical Site, Amana, ID ($131,500)
- Assessing and Repairing 4 Extant Buildings at Fort Atkinson Historic District, Des Moines, IA ($497,500)
- Restoration of Olson House, Site of American Artist Andrew Wyeth’s Painting, Christina’s World, William A. Farnsworth Library and Art Museum, Rockland, ME ($188,208)
- Preservation, Conservation and Digitization of Kennedy Family Collection, Scrapbooks and Albums, John F. Kennedy Library Foundation, Inc., Boston, MA ($500,000)
- Preservation of the Nantucket Lightship/LV-112, United States Lightship Museum, Inc., Boston, MA ($487,500)
- Isaiah T. Montgomery House Restoration, Mississippi Heritage Trust, Inc., Mound Bayou, MS ($500,000)
- Curation of Archaeological Materials and Associated Records, University of Mississippi, Oxford, MS ($500,000)
- Restoring Willa Cather's Childhood Home, Willa Cather Foundation, Red Cloud, NE ($415,000)
- Rehabilitation of the Adirondack Great Camp, Eagle Island, Eagle Island, Inc., Livingston, NJ ($320,775)
- Fort Bayard Museum and Education Building Restoration, Village of Santa Clara, Santa Clara, NM ($125,000)
- Conservation and Preservation of the Casita Desiderio y Pablita Ortega, Cornerstones Community Partnerships, Chimayo, NM ($144,911)
- Asbestos Abatement and Remediation aboard USS Slater, Destroyer Escort Historical Museum, Albany, NY ($176,000)
- Richardson Olmsted Campus Roofing Repairs, Richardson Center Corporation, Buffalo, NY ($400,000)
- Conservation of Carnegie Hall Architectural Drawings Collection, Carnegie Hall Corporation, New York, NY ($92,000)
- Conservation of the New York Historical Society's Beekman family coach, New-York Historical Society, New York, NY ($116,467)
- Eastman Museum Colonnade Restoration Project, George Eastman Museum, Rochester, NY ($498,815)
- Restoration of Fort Ticonderoga's North Demi-lune, Fort Ticonderoga Association, Ticonderoga, NY ($465,000)
- Black Mountain College Collection Conservation, Asheville Art Museum Association, Inc., Asheville, NC ($196,935)
- Preservation of the Free Labor Store/Benjamin Lundy House, Ohio Historical Society, Mt. Pleasant, OH ($228,160)
- Perkins Historical Property Restoration Project, City of Warren, Ohio ($500,000)
- Preservation of 61 (non-deed) Historical Record Books Starting in 1785, County of Bucks, Doylestown, PA ($125,000)
- August Wilson House Preservation Project, Duquesne University, Pittsburgh, PA ($499,628)
- Marble House Roof Restoration, The Preservation Society of Newport County, Newport, RI ($500,000)
- Remediation of Rising Damp at Historic Christ Church, Foundation for Historic Christ Church, Inc., Irvington, VA ($337,500)
- Structural Repairs, Moisture Mitigation, and Re-roofing of the Petersburg Exchange Building, Historic Petersburg Foundation, Petersburg, VA ($350,000)
- Rehabilitation of Fort Worden Building 305 (Historic Quartermasters Office & Storehouse), Fort Worden Foundation, Port Townsend, WA ($500,000)
- Historic Concrete Rehabilitation of the Georgetown Steam Plant, Seattle City Light, Seattle, WA ($500,000)
- Systems update for the home of Revolutionary Colonel Charles Washington, Friends of Happy Retreat, Charlestown, WV ($132,500)
- Renovation of “Old Main” (Building 2) National Soldiers Home Residences, Housing Authority of the City of Milwaukee, WI ($500,000)
- Preservation of the A.D. German Warehouse, A.D. German Warehouse Conservancy, Inc., Richland Center, WI ($360,250)
- Digital Recordation of Site Records and Artifacts Recovered from the Hell Gap NHL Archeological Site, University of Wyoming, Laramie, WY ($260,675)

==== 2019 ($12.8 million awarded) ====
- Conservation and Restoration of Space Shuttle Pathfinder Orbiter Simulator, Alabama Space Science Exhibit Commission, Huntsville, AL, ($500,000)
- Rehabilitation of Harada House National Historic Landmark, City of Riverside, Riverside, CA ($500,000)
- Casa Colorado Site Stabilization and Repair, Ute Mountain Ute Tribe, Towaoc, CO ($125,000)
- Preserving and Accessing Mystic Seaport Museum Curatorial Files, Mystic Seaport Museum, Inc., Mystic, CT ($102,000)
- Union Station East Hall Scagliola Finish Restoration, Union Station Redevelopment Corporation, Washington, D.C. ($342,500)
- Preservation of the Wurts Brothers Photography Collection, National Building Museum, Washington, D. C. ($121,182)
- Restoration of Polk Science Building Planetarium, Florida Southern College, Lakeland, FL ($250,000)
- Preservation of Historic Superintendent's House at Vizcaya, Vizcaya Museum and Gardens Trust, Inc., Miami, FL ($500,000)
- Preserving the Gwendolyn Brooks Papers, The Board of Trustees of the University of Illinois, Champaign, IL ($115,237)
- Preservation of Samara, the John E. and Catherine E. Christian House, Historic Landmarks Foundation of Indiana, West Lafayette, IN ($500,000)
- Repair and Restoration of the First Christian Church Tower, Southern Indiana Housing and Community Development Corp, Columbus, IN ($500,000)
- Planning for Sustainable Collections Improvements, The Children's Museum of Indianapolis, Indianapolis, IN ($124,642)
- Building Improvements to the William S. Webb Museum of Anthropology Collections Center, University of Kentucky Research Foundation, Lexington, KY ($445,327)
- Preservation of the McDonogh 19 Elementary School Cafeteria, Leona Tate Foundation for Change, Inc., New Orleans, LA ($500,000)
- Frances Perkins Homestead Preservation Project, Frances Perkins Center, New Castle, ME ($500,000)
- Hamilton House Preservation and Resiliency Project, Society for the Preservation of New England Antiquities, South Berwick, ME ($165,000)
- Conserving High Priority Artifacts at Historic St. Mary's City, State of Maryland, dba Historic St. Mary's City Commission, St. Mary’s City, MD ($121,520)
- Conservation of the Maryland Historical Society Daguerreotype Collection, Maryland Historical Society, Baltimore, MD ($120,875)
- Preservation of the Historic Hall of Waters, City of Excelsior Springs, Excelsior Springs, MO ($500,000)
- Repair of Nevada Northern Railway Locomotive #40, Nevada Northern Railway Foundation, Inc., Ely, NV ($487,160)
- Preservation of Morven Historic Home, Historic Morven, Inc., Princeton, NJ ($210,000)
- Conserving the Count Basie Papers and Artifacts, Rutgers, the State University of New Jersey-Newark, Newark, NJ ($443,500)
- Preservation of Los Luceros Historic Site, Museum of New Mexico Foundation, Santa Fe, NM ($451,252)
- Preserving the Fashion Institute of Technology Records from the Garment District, Fashion Institute of Technology, New York, NY ($83,137)
- John F. Nash Tugboat (LT-5) Preservation Project, H. Lee White Maritime Museum at Oswego, Oswego, NY ($365,593)
- Gustav Stickley House Restoration, Greater Syracuse Land Bank, Syracuse, NY ($500,000)
- Edward Blank YIVO Vilna Online Collections, YIVO Institute for Jewish Research, New York, NY ($119,433)
- Conservation and Digitization of Henry Darger Collection Materials, American Folk Art Museum, Long Island City, NY ($156,700)
- Canal Society of New York State Collections Inventory and Rehousing, Canal Society of New York State, Manlius, NY ($171,000)
- US Navy Submarine USS Cod (SS 224) Restoration, Cleveland Coordinating Committee for Cod, Inc., Richfield, OH ($395,050)
- Taft Museum of Art Rehabilitation, Taft Museum of Art, Cincinnati, OH ($500,000)
- Stabilization of Cellblocks 13 and 14 of Eastern State Penitentiary, Eastern State Penitentiary Historic Site, Inc., Philadelphia, PA ($498,717)
- Johnstown Incline Restoration Project, Cambria County Transit Authority, Johnstown, PA ($500,000)
- Exterior Preservation of Wyck House, Wyck Association, Philadelphia, PA ($209,202)
- Manuscripts of the Muslim World at the Free Library of Philadelphia, Free Library of Philadelphia Foundation, Philadelphia, PA ($100,000)
- Wilkinsburg Borough's WPA Mural and Grand Army of the Republic Textiles, Center for Civic Arts, Pittsburgh, PA ($25,000)
- Army Medical Department Museum Public Access and Modernization, United States Army Medical Department Museum Foundation, Inc., San Antonio, TX ($480,000)
- Saving the Keller Collection at the Utah State University Museum of Anthropology, Utah State University, Logan, UT ($74,464)
- Preservation of the Fairbanks Museum and Planetarium, Fairbanks Museum and Planetarium, St. Johnsbury, VT ($458,400)
- Conservation of the Samuel Chapman Armstrong Letter Books, Hampton University, Hampton, VI ($249,898)
- Conserving the 1925 fishing vessel Shenandoah, Gig Harbor Peninsula Historical Society, Gig Harbor, WA ($130,453)
- Vore Buffalo Jump Collection Conservation and Digitization, Wyoming Department of State Parks and Cultural Resources, Cheyenne, WY ($157,758)

==== 2020 ($15.5 million awarded) ====
- Hydrology Modeling and Erosion Control at Bottle Creek Indian Mounds, Alabama Historic Commission, AL ($125,000)
- Rehabilitation of Whitmore Hall, Sheldon Jackson School, Alaska Arts Southeast, AK ($351,000)
- Preservation of the Rose Bowl Stadium, Legacy Connections, CA ($500,000 )
- Maloof Roof Replacement Project, Sam and Alfreda Maloof Foundation, CA ($335,850)
- Jones-Miller Collection Preservation: a Paleoindian bison kill site, Colorado Museum of Natural History dba DMNS, CO ($206,933)
- Preservation of the Witherill Ocean Liner Collection, Mystic Seaport Museum, Inc., CT ($52,300)
- Restoration of the Barnum Museum Historic Windows, Barnum Museum Foundation, Inc., CT ($500,000)
- Old New-Gate Prison and Coppermine Cell Block Stabilization, Connecticut Department of Economic and Community Development, CT ($317,000)
- Saving Whittlin’ History: Conservation of the unique works of Jehu Camper, a one-of-kind American folk artist, Delaware Agricultural Museum and Village, DE ($47,950)
- Restoration and Repair of the Iolani Palace Roof, The Friends of Iolani Palace, HI ($499,629)
- Assay Office Rehabilitation, Idaho State Historical Society, ID ($500,000)
- Conserving the Chancel Artwork, Friends of Historic Second Church, IL ($256,364)
- Auburn Cord Duesenberg Automobile Museum Roof & HVAC Replacement Project, Auburn Automotive Heritage, Inc., IN ($500,000)
- Public Access to Topeka’s Constitution Hall, Friends of the Free State Capitol Inc., KS ($292,670)
- Rescuing the B&O No. 3316 ‘Washington’ Pullman Tavern-Observation Car, B&O Railroad Museum, Inc., MD ($500,000)
- Digitization and Conservation of the Blue Hill Meteorological Observatory Climate Record, Blue Hill Observatory and Science Center, Inc., MA ($90,720)
- Rehabilitation of the Commanding Officer’s House at Historic Fort Wayne, City of Detroit, MI ($500,000)
- Rehabilitation of the Plummer House Water Tower, City of Rochester, MN ($383,650)
- Moving Mounds: Uniting Mississippi’s Native History with Modern Tribal Voices, Mississippi Department of Archives and History, MS ($291,109)
- Chief Plenty Coups Homestead Rehabilitation, Montana Fish, Wildlife and Parks, MT ($140,537)
- Picotte Center Phase III Renovation, Susan Laflesche Picotte Center, NE ($300,000)
- NNRy Archive Record Vault Collection Storage, Nevada Northern Railway Foundation, Inc., NV ($260,000)
- Restoration and preservation of teak deck-Areas 3, 4, 5 and 7, Home Port Alliance for the USS New Jersey, Inc., NJ ($500,000)
- The Conservation, Restoration, Installation, Exhibition, and Interpretation of the Ross Hall Wall, c.1740, Township of Piscataway/Fellowship for Metlar House, NJ ($150,000)
- Lucy the Elephant Exterior Restoration Phase II, Save Lucy Committee, Inc., NJ ($500,000)
- Seward House Museum Rehabilitation, Seward House Museum, NY ($500,000)
- Robert Jenkins House Rehabilitation, Hendrick Hudson Chapter NSDAR, Inc., NY ($496,775)
- Rehabilitation of the Bevier-Elting House, Huguenot Historical Society, New Paltz, NY ($500,000)
- Woodlawn Cemetery Mausoleum Mosaic Project, Woodlawn Conservancy Inc., NY ($125,000)
- USS The Sullivans Hull Repairs, Buffalo Naval Park Committee, Inc., NY ($499,112)
- Saving Stories of Our Immigrant Past: Preserving the Baron de Hirsch Fund Records, Center for Jewish History, Inc., NY ($352,500)
- Conservation of the Off-Off-Broadway and American Experimental Theatre Movement Collection, La MaMa Experimental Theatre Club, Inc., NY ($64,900)
- Conservation of Original Drawing Plans for the Brooklyn Bridge, Department of Records and Information Services, NY ($249,495)
- Repairing Opus 40, Harvey Fite’s remarkable earthwork sculpture, Opus 40, Inc., NY ($300,000)
- The Digital Collection Organizational and Accessibility Project, Friends of Alice Austen House Inc., NY ($59,170)
- Preserving a Rust Belt Legacy: Stained Glass Window Restoration, First Presbyterian Church of Warren, OH ($145,477)
- The Lightship Columbia (WAL-604) Drydock, Inspection, Repair and Preservation Project, Columbia River Maritime Museum, OR ($406,833)
- The Barbara Gittings Exhibition Booths project, Gay Community Center of Philadelphia, PA ($29,520)
- Restoration of the #6 Cast House, Bridge Deck, and Sloughway at the Carrie Blast Furnaces, Rivers of Steel Heritage Corporation, PA ($358,667)
- Carpenters’ Hall Preservation Project, Carpenter’s Company of the City and County of Philadelphia, PA ($500,000)
- ADA Improvements to Restore Public Access to the Old State House, Historical Preservation and Heritage Commission, RI ($500,000)
- Cooper River Canoe Project, Clemson University, SC ($129,550)
- Mission Dolores Archeological Collections Rehabilitation Project, Friends of the Texas Historical Commission, TX ($101,673)
- Rehabilitation and Stabilization of Battleship Texas’s Superstructure, Battleship Texas Foundation, Inc., TX ($500,000)
- Vermont Sculpture on the Highway-16, State of Vermont: Vermont Department of Building & General Services, VT ($241,208)
- Site Drainage and Water Management Project for the Senator Justin S. Morrill State Historic Site, Vermont Division for Historic Preservation (Vermont SHPO), VT ($226,725)
- Rehabilitation of the Shelburne Farms Breeding Barn, Shelburne Farms, VT ($500,000)
- Preservation of Business Office at Ringling Brothers Circus Winter Headquarters, Wisconsin Historical Society, WI ($499,999)
- Saving Sokaogon Chippewa Community’s Endangered Artifacts and Oral Tradition, Sokaogon Chippewa Community, WI ($132,684)

==== 2021 (24.25 million awarded) ====
- Restoration of the Historic Brown Chapel A.M.E. Church's South and West Balconies, Historic Brown Chapel AME Church Preservation Society, Inc., Selma, AL ($202,400)
- Yik'a'nahtii (Care in Teetl'it Gwich'in Athabascan), Alaska Native Heritage Center Inc., Anchorage, AK $107,244)
- Conservation of Bus 142: An Alaskan Icon, University of Alaska Fairbanks, Fairbanks, AK ($500,000)
- Preservation and Digitization of the Herbert and Trudl Zipper Archive, Colburn School, Los Angeles, CA ($374,655)
- Restoration of Diego Rivera's “The Making of a Fresco Showing the Building of a City”, San Francisco Art Institute, San Francisco, CA ($34,100)
- Mission Santa Inés Rehabilitation, California Missions Foundation, Solvang, CA ($500,000)
- Protecting the Colorado Chautauqua from Wildfire, Colorado Chautauqua Association, Boulder, CO ($280,721)
- Rehabilitation of the Historic Williams' Stables, Central City Opera House Association, Wheat Ridge, CO ($275,038)
- Digitize Avon's 19th Century History, Avon Free Public Library, Avon, CT ($50,016)
- Whittemore House Repairs, WNDC Educational Foundation, Washington, D.C. ($313,057)
- Cooper Molera Adobe Restoration Project, National Trust for Historic Preservation in the US, Washington, D.C. ($500,000)
- Preservation of the Architectural Toy Collection, National Building Museum, Washington, D.C. ($62,250)
- Charles Sumner School Museum and Archives Conservation and Digitization, Friends of Sumner Museum and Archives, Washington, D.C. ($37,021)
- Saving the Olmstedian Landscape Gardens at Mountain Lake Sanctuary, Bok Tower Gardens, Inc., Lake Wales, FL ($500,000)
- Saving and Rehabilitating the Coastal Zone Collections of Georgia, University of Georgia Research Foundation, Athens, GA ($385,178)
- Roosevelt Pools Restoration Project, Friends of Georgia State Parks & Historic Sites, Cartersville, GA ($500,000)
- Dry Docking the WWII Fleet Submarine USS Bowfin, Pacific Fleet Submarine Memorial Association, Inc., Honolulu, HI ($500,000)
- Final Phase of the Historic Ford Island Control Tower (Building S-84) Repair, Pearl Harbor Aviation Museum, Honolulu, HI ($440,900)
- Rehabilitation of the University of Illinois Astronomical Observatory, Board of Trustees of the University of Illinois, Champaign, IL ($500,000)
- Conservation of the Ueckert Circus Collection, Board of Trustees of Illinois State University, Normal, IL ($29,294)
- Rehabilitation of the Carnegie Dome of the Streator Public Library, Streator Public Library, Streator, IL ($139,075)
- Mold Remediation for the International Museum of the Horse, Kentucky Horse Park, Lexington, KY ($206,327)
- Conservation and Digitization of the Mineral Core Collection from the Western Kentucky Fluorspar and South-Central Kentucky Mineral Districts, University of Kentucky Research Foundation, Lexington, KY ($423,227)
- G.B. Cooley House Rehabilitation, City of Monroe, Monroe, LA ($483,500)
- Rehabilitation of a Shaker Great Barn, United Society of Shakers, Sabbathday Lake, Inc., New Gloucester, ME ($500,000)
- Conservation Assessment of Archeological Materials, State of Maryland, DBA Historic St. Mary's City Commission, St. Mary’s City, MD ($99,963)
- Preservation of the Great House at Castle Hill, The Trustees of Reservations, Boston, MA ($499,950)
- Preservation of the Martha's Vineyard Camp Meeting Association Tabernacle, Martha's Vineyard, Oak Bluffs, MA ($500,000)
- Conservation of Panel from Charles Sidney Raleigh's “Panorama of a Whaling Voyage Around the World”, Old Dartmouth Historical Society, dba New Bedford Whaling Museum, New Bedford, MA ($45,000)
- Preservation of Antiquarian Hall, American Antiquarian Society, Worcester, MA ($300,000)
- Ford Piquette Avenue Plant Fire Prevention, Model-T Automotive Heritage Complex, Inc., Detroit, MI ($500,000)
- Preservation of the Only Remaining Douglas Dauntless SBD-1, Kalamazoo Aviation History Museum dba Air Zoo, Kalamazoo, MI ($439,098)
- Inventory and Curation of the Section 106 Collection, Mississippi Department of Archives and History, Jackson, MS ($133,260)
- Rehabilitation of Temple B'nai Israel, Institute of Southern Jewish Life, Jackson, MS ($495,542)
- Preservation of Tower Grove Park's Victorian Pavilion Collection, Board of Commissioners of Tower Grove Park, Saint Louis, MO ($500,000)
- Enfield Shaker Museum Stone Mill Preservation, Chosen Vale, Inc., dba Enfield Shaker Museum, Enfield, NH ($129,667)
- Digitization Infrastructure for the College’s Archives and New Jersey State Normal School Historical Records, The College of New Jersey, Ewing, NJ ($311,594)
- Hinchliffe Stadium Neighborhood Rehabilitation Project, Life Management Inc., Montclair, NJ ($500,000)
- Rehabilitation of the Historic Rogers Building, City of Paterson, Paterson, NJ ($500,000)
- Preservation and Digitization of Ephemera from the Urban Bush Women Archive, UBW, Inc., Brooklyn, NY ($215,250)
- Conservation and Digitization of Louis Armstrong’s Collages, Louis Armstrong House Museum, Corona, NY ($137,500)
- Museum Collection Lighting Rehabilitation, Museums at Mitchel DBA Cradle of Aviation Museum, Garden City, NY ($263,757)
- Preservation of Fire Fighter, America's Fireboat, Fireboat Fire Fighter Museum, Greenport, NY ($450,750)
- Preservation of Poets House Special Collections and Multi-media Archive, Poets House, Inc., New York, NY ($123,819)
- Documentary Film Collection Conservation, Cabin Creek Center for Work and Environmental Studies, Inc., New York, NY ($37,500)
- Preservation and Digitization of Select Ballets from the Foundation Archives, Alvin Ailey Dance Foundation, Inc., New York, NY ($488,876)
- Historic Wood Windows Rehabilitation Project, Westbeth Corp. Housing Development Fund Company, Inc., New York, NY ($500,000)
- New York Studio School's Building Preservation, New York, NY ($400,00)
- Restoration of Allan Herschell Number One Special Carousel, Carousel Society of the Niagara Frontier, North Tonawanda, NY ($26,040)
- Phase 2 Mansion House Repairs, Oneida Community Mansion House, Oneida, NY ($500,000)
- Restoration of Harry Bertoia’s “Golden Dandelions” Sculpture, Rochester Institute of Technology, Rochester, NY ($76,534)
- Preservation of Nikola Tesla’s Laboratory at Wardenclyffe, Friends of Science East, Inc., Shoreham, NY ($500,000)
- Rehabilitation of the 1856 Wilson Bruce Evans House, Wilson Bruce Evans Home Historical Society, Oberlin, OH ($283,250)
- Conservation of the Works on Paper Collection, Wharton Esherick Museum, Paoli, PA ($130,657)
- Stenton Mansion and Wing Preservation, National Society of the Colonial Dames of America, Philadelphia, PA ($127,300)
- Historic Waynesborough Preservation, Philadelphia Society for the Preservation of Landmarks, Philadelphia, PA ($200,525)
- Laurel Hill Gatehouse Rehabilitation, Friends of Laurel Hill & West Laurel Hill Cemeteries, Philadelphia, PA ($500,000)
- Preservation of the Christ Church Burial Ground, Christ Church Preservation Trust, Philadelphia, PA ($140,284)
- Preservation of Historic Vaccination Materials to Inform Today and Tomorrow, The College of Physicians of Philadelphia, Philadelphia, PA ($59,406)
- USS Olympia Cofferdam Hull Repairs, Independence Seaport Museum, Philadelphia, PA ($54,204)
- Conservation of the Carpenters' Hall Library Collections, The Carpenters' Company, Philadelphia, PA ($50,000)
- Preservation of Maxo Vanka's Murals, Society to Preserve the Millvale Murals of Maxo Vanka, Pittsburgh, PA ($471,670)
- Preservation of the General Burnside Building, Herreshoff Marine Museum, Bristol, RI ($413,709)
- Conservation and Digitization of the Naval War College and Naval War College Foundation Collections, Naval War College Foundation, Newport, RI ($137,833)
- Rehabilitation of Blacklock House, College of Charleston, Charleston, SC ($274,215)
- Collection Management and Preservation of the Native American Collections, University of South Carolina, Columbia, SC ($83,805)
- Save the Maitland: America's Railroad Passenger Legacy, Tennessee Valley Railroad Museum Inc., Chattanooga TN ($200,000)
- Process Collections from the Fanthorp Inn, Varner-Hogg Plantation, and San Felipe de Austin State Historic Sites, Friends of the Texas Historical Commission, Austin, TX ($117,718)
- Conservation of The Orange Show, The Orange Show Foundation, Houston, TX ($500,000)
- Processing and Digitization of Native American and Buffalo Soldier Artifacts, Hutchings Museum, Lehi, UT ($70,035)
- Preparation for Receipt of the Perry Collection, Shelburne Museum, Inc., Shelburne, VT ($37,415)
- Coach Barn Fire Protection, Shelburne Farms, Shelburne, VT ($500,000)
- Exterior Preservation of the Freedom House Museum, City of Alexandria, Alexandria, VA ($500,000)
- Preservation and Digitization of Folk and Roots Documentaries, Folkstreams, Inc., Delaplane, VA ($199,725)
- Rehabilitation of Building 14, Fort Monroe Authority, Fort Monroe, VA ($372,437)
- Preservation of Bacon's Castle, Association for the Preservation of Virginia Antiquities, Virginia, VA ($400,395)
- Historic Shell House Stabilization, University of Washington, Seattle, WA ($499,975)
- Preservation of the American System-Built Home, Model C3, by Frank Lloyd Wright, Frank Lloyd Wright's Burnham Block, Inc., Brookfield, WI ($407,340)
- Preservation of the 1901 Animal House at the Ringling Brothers Circus Winter Headquarters, State Historical Society of Wisconsin, Madison, WI ($499,999)
- Dry Docking of USS Cobia, Wisconsin Maritime Museum, Manitowoc, WI ($500,000)

==== 2022 ($25.7 million awarded) ====
- Noow Hit Tribal House Stabilization and Rehabilitation at Fort William H. Seward, Chilkoot Indian Association, Haines, AK ($744,507)
- Preservation of Historic Douglas Municipal Airport Runway, City of Douglas, Douglas, AZ ($750,000)
- Preservation of the Poston Elementary School Site I, Poston Community Alliance, Pleasant Hill, CA ($296,827)
- Rehabilitation of the Zanetta House/Plaza Hall, California Department of Parks and Recreation, Sacramento, CA ($748,747)
- Former Naval Training Center Building 178 Rehabilitation Project, NTC Foundation, San Diego, CA ($686,799)
- Presidio Chapel Rehabilitation, Interfaith Center at the Presidio, San Francisco, CA ($750,000)
- Mission San Juan Bautista Rehabilitation, California Missions Foundation, Santa Barbara, CA ($750,000)
- Mare Island Officers' Quarters B Rehabilitation, City of Vallejo, Vallejo, CA ($750,000)
- Conservation of African American Quilts Collection, The Berkeley Art Museum and Pacific Film Archive, Berkeley, CA ($461,512)
- Chris Strachwitz Collection: Processing and Digitization Planning Project, Arhoolie Foundation, Contra Costa, CA ($100,649)
- Denver Civic Center Central Promenade Rehabilitation, City and County of Denver; Parks & Recreation Department, Denver, CO ($750,000)
- Historic Wallpaper Rehabilitation at the Phelps-Hatheway House & Garden, The Antiquarian and Landmarks Society, Incorporated, Hartford, CT ($146,500)
- Rehabilitation of First Presbyterian Church, Highland Green Foundation, Stamford, CT ($750,000)
- The Rehabilitation of Monte Cristo Cottage, Eugene O'Neill Memorial Theater Center, Waterford, CT ($138,594)
- Lyndhurst Swimming Pool Building Rehabilitation, National Trust for Historic Preservation in the US, Washington, D.C. ($750,000)
- Preservation of the Gunboat Philadelphia, Smithsonian Institution, Washington, D.C. ($750,000)
- Winterthur Museum, Garden & Library Historic Gatehouse Preservation Project, Henry Francis du Pont Winterthur Museum, Inc., Winterthur, DE ($125,000)
- Haitian Heritage Museum Collection: Roger L. Farnham's Photo Albums' Preservation, Haitian Heritage Museum Corp., Miami, FL ($39,500)
- Rehabilitation of a Ludwig Mies van der Rohe Building, VanderCook College of Music, Chicago, IL ($750,000)
- Restoration of Ragdale's Arts & Crafts Garden, Ragdale Foundation, Lake Forest, IL ($368,343)
- Perseveration of Authentic Single Source Cultural Aviation Models for Collections Stewardship and Access, Academy of Model Aeronautics, Munice, IN ($66,000)
- Project Archivist to Prepare Archival Assets for Online Dissemination at the William Inge Collection, Independence Community College, Independence, KS ($49,785)
- Capital City Museum Collections Conservation and Rehousing, Capital City Museum, Frankfort, KY ($87,520)
- Recovery, Restoration and Digitization of Appalshop's Audiovisual Collections, Appalshop, Whitesburg, KY ($750,000)
- Preservation of Swigert-Taylor House, City of Frankfort, Frankfort, KY ($750,000)
- Saving Benjamin Henry Latrobe’s Pope Villa, Blue Grass Trust for Historic Preservation, Lexington, KY ($748,467)
- Preservation of Big House and Bindery at Melrose Plantation, Association for the Preservation of Historic Natchitoches, Natchitoches, LA ($200,000)
- Preservation of the Brick Kitchen & Slave Quarters of the Jeremiah Lee Estate, Marblehead Museum & Historical Society, Inc., Marblehead, MA ($308,363)
- Preserving American Orchestral Performance Practices of the late 19th/early 20th century, Boston Symphony Orchestra, Boston, MA ($257,377)
- Preserving Mayflower II: A Project to Ensure the Longevity of a National Icon, Plimoth Patuxet Museums, Plymouth, MA ($163,680)
- Adaptive Reuse of the Ellicott City Jail, Society for the Preservation of Maryland Antiquities, Inc., Baltimore, MD ($743,924)
- Women's Work: Saving Kvinden og Hjemmet and other Norwegian-American Immigrant Serial Publications, St. Olaf College, Northfield, MN ($52,109)
- Rehabilitation of Raymond Hall, Mississippi Department of Archives and History, Jackson, MS ($106,237)
- Johnny Carson Collection Preservation Improvements, Elkhorn Valley Historical Society, Norfolk, NE ($31,700)
- Montgomery Place Exterior Building Envelope Rehabilitation, Bard College, Annandale-on-Hudson, NY ($750,000)
- Caramoor's Window Rehabilitation Project, Caramoor Center for Music and the Arts, Inc., Katonah, NY ($183,213)
- 1737 Sylvester Manor House Preservation and Rehabilitation, Sylvester Manor Educational Farm, Inc., Shelter Island, NY ($750,000)
- Jewish Labor and Political Archives, YIVO Institute for Jewish Research, New York, NY ($224,007)
- The Panorama of the City of New York, Queens Museum of Art, New York, NY ($315,000)
- Southern Appalachian and Western North Carolina Artworks Conservation/Preservation, Asheville Art Museum, Asheville, NC ($151,933)
- Preservation of Stone Barracks at Fort Gibson, Oklahoma Historical Society, Oklahoma City, OK ($750,000)
- Braddock Carnegie Library Association Music Hall Rehabilitation, Braddock Carnegie Library Association, Braddock, PA ($500,000)
- Johnstown Flood Museum Rehabilitation, Johnstown Area Heritage Association, Johnstown, PA ($750,000)
- Moisture Remediation and Rehabilitation at Grumblethorpe and Grumblethorpe Tenant House, Philadelphia Society for the Preservation of Landmarks, Philadelphia, PA ($561,692)
- 48" Universal Plate Mill Collection, Rivers of Steel Heritage Corporation, Homestead, PA ($750,000)
- The Penn Family Papers at the Historical Society of Pennsylvania, Historical Society of Pennsylvania, Philadelphia, PA ($82,280)
- Preserving and Providing Access to the Texas Map Research Center, Sul Ross State University (Museum of the Big Bend), Alpine, TX ($200,000)
- Christiansted Old Barracks Property Project, Virgin Islands Architecture Center for Built Heritage and Crafts, Christiansted, USVI ($750,000)
- Mariners Access Initiative: Uncovering Hidden Maritime Cultural Heritage, Mariners Museum, Newport News, VA ($392,487)
- Addressing Immediate Threats to the Non-Living Collection at Lewis Ginter Botanical Garden, Lewis Ginter Botanical Garden, Richmond, VA ($170,250)
- Increased Conservation of BIPOC Artifacts from Kingsmill, Commonwealth of Virginia Department of Historic Resources, Richmond, VA ($176,176)
- The Executive Papers of Virginia Governor Thomas Nelson Jr. Conservation Project, Library of Virginia Foundation, Richmond, VA ($299,217)
- Henry Art Gallery: Collections Storage and Access Upgrade Project, Henry Gallery Association, Seattle, WA ($204,415)
- Preservation of Armory Dwelling House #24 from the 2nd US National Armory, People Tree Ministerial Services, Inc., Harpers Ferry, WV ($402,440)
- Preservation and digitization of 26 critical collections documenting those at the forefront of the civil rights struggle in the United States, State Historical Society, Madison, WI ($750,000)
- Drydocking of the tug John Purves, Door County Maritime Museum and Lighthouse, Sturgeon Bay, WI ($196,250)
- Fort Caspar Historical Log Building Rehabilitation, City of Casper, Casper, WY ($723,500)
- Improving and remodeling collections storage spaces at the Buffalo Bill Center of the West, Buffalo Bill Memorial Association, Cody, WY ($750,000)

==== 2023 ($25.7 million awarded) ====
- Casa del Herrero Project, California Missions Foundation, Santa Barbara, CA ($750,000)
- Japanese American National Museum, Los Angeles, CA ($750,000)
- Marbeth Legacy Project: Dance Theatre of Harlem Portfolio, ChromaDiverse, Inc., San Francisco, CA ($147,265)
- Transfer Warehouse, Telluride Council for the Arts and Humanities, Telluride, CO ($750,000)
- National Mining Hall of Fame and Museum, Leadville, CO ($74,986)
- Northwestern Terra Cotta Collection, National Building Museum, Washington, D.C. ($177,000)
- Swimming Pool Grotto and Ceiling Mural by Robert Winthrop Chanler, Vizcaya Museum and Gardens Trust, Inc., Miami, FL ($750,000)
- Sears Catalog Complex, Foundation for Homan Square, Chicago, IL ($362,750)
- Early Presidential Costume Conservation, Chicago Historical Society, Chicago, IL $454,607)
- Chicago in the Year 2000: Preserving the Voices and Sounds of Chicago through Digitization, The Board of Trustees of the University of Illinois, Chicago, IL ($122,914)
- Galena & Ulysses S. Grant Museum, Galena-Jo Daviess County Historical Society, Galena, IL ($613,298)
- LSU Campus Mounds Preservation Project, Louisiana State University, Baton Rouge, LA ($220,871)
- Shipman Collection, Longue Vue House and Gardens Corporation, New Orleans, LA ($372,250)
- Mount Vernon Place Conservancy, Baltimore, MD ($750,000)
- American Freedom Train No. 1, The B&O Railroad Museum, Baltimore, MD ($363,750)
- Historic St. Mary’s City Commission, St. Mary's City, MD ($228,659)
- Captain Robert Bennet Forbes House Museum, Milton, MA ($673,520)
- Flying Horses Carousel, Martha's Vineyard Preservation Trust, Edgartown, MA ($232,658)
- Portraits Restoration Project, Worcester County Mechanics Association (d/b/a Mechanics Hall), Worcester, MA ($22,901)
- Meadow Brook Hall Window and Stained-Glass Restoration Project, Oakland University, Rochester, MI ($264,005)
- Historic Copper Mining Drill Hole Records, Michigan Technological University, Houghton, MI ($118,898)
- Arthur Secunda Collection, Cleary University, Howell, MI ($319,880)
- America’s Conservation Legacy Collection, National Museum of Forest Service History, Missoula, MT ($343,670)
- Omaha Union Station, The Durham Museum, Omaha, NE ($750,000)
- Dover Friends Meetinghouse, Dover Friends Meeting, Dover, NH ($183,084)
- Absecon Lighthouse, Inlet Public/Private Association, Inc., Atlantic City, NJ ($750,000)
- Blackwater Draw National Historic Landmark Photos, Negatives, and Distinct Sub-Collections Digitizing Project, Eastern New Mexico University, Portales, NM ($53,299)
- St. Bartholomew's Church, St. Bartholomew's Conservancy, Inc., New York, NY ($749,840)
- Washington Irving's Sunnyside, Historic Hudson Valley, Tarrytown, NY ($630,300)
- Greater Hudson Heritage Network, Elmsford, NY *$269,038)
- Anti-Defamation League's Civil Rights Information Center and Center on Extremism, American Jewish Historical Society, New York, NY ($165,288)
- Digitization of Archaeological Data from New York City's Stadt Huys Block and 7 Hanover Square Projects, NYC Landmarks Preservation Commission, New York, NY ($88,670)
- African American Collection, The Paley Center for Media, New York, NY ($750,000)
- Livingston County Historical Society, Geneseo, NY ($150,000)
- Staten Island Museum Founders’ Papers, Staten Island Institute of Arts and Sciences, Staten Island, NY ($303,408)
- Basilica of St. Lawrence, Basilica Preservation Fund, Inc., Asheville, NC ($750,000)
- Digitization of Critical Videotape Collections Covering Aspects of the 1995 Oklahoma City Bombing, Oklahoma City National Memorial Foundation, Oklahoma City, OK ($89,428)
- Native Collection, Philbrook Museum of Art, Inc., Tulsa, OK ($466,676)
- Carrie Blast Furnaces, Rivers of Steel Heritage Corporation, Swissvale, PA ($580,000)
- Pennsylvania Academy of the Fine Arts, Philadelphia, PA ($750,000)
- Arch Street Meeting House Preservation Trust, Philadelphia, PA ($336,187)
- Sedgwick Theater, Quintessence Theater Group, Philadelphia, PA ($296,092)
- Woodmere Art Museum, Philadelphia, PA ($750,000)
- Atwater Kent Collection, Drexel University, Philadelphia, PA ($138,547)
- Historic 1927 5-Manual, 21-Rank, Wurlitzer Pipe Organ, Providence Performing Arts Center, Providence, RI ($650,000)
- Cathedral of St. Luke and St. Paul, Charleston, SC ($750,000)
- Rehabilitating Archaeological Collections from the Catawba-Wateree River Valley of South Carolina, University of South Carolina, Columbia, SC ($629,001)
- Eddy Arnold Time: Preservation and Access to Early Country Music Television on 16mm Film, Country Music Foundation, Inc., Nashville, TN ($48,224)
- Center for Appalachian Studies and Services, East Tennessee State University, Johnson City, TN ($171,941)
- Fair Park Tower Building Mural Restoration, City of Dallas, Dallas, TX ($700,000)
- Naulakha, The Landmark Trust USA, Inc., Dummerston, VT ($401,274)
- William & Mary Wren Building, College of William & Mary, Williamsburg, VA ($416,207)
- Legislative Petitions from Virginia Burned Record Counties, Library of Virginia Foundation, Richmond, VA ($172,828)
- Museum of Glass, Tacoma, WA ($173,848)
- Nenni Building, Coalfield Development Corporation, Huntington, WV ($748,785)
- Baggage Horse Barn at Ringling Brothers Circus Winter Headquarters, State Historical Society of Wisconsin, Baraboo, WI ($729,153)
- National Soldiers Home Governor’s Mansion, Building 39, Center for Veterans Issues, Inc., Milwaukee, WI ($750,000)
- National Soldiers Home Chapel, Building 12, Center for Veterans Issues, Inc., Milwaukee, WI ($750,000)
- Annunciation Greek Orthodox Church Foundation, Wauwatosa, WI ($750,000)

== See also ==
- Historic preservation
- State Historic Preservation Office
- Sustainability

== Sources ==
- Rypkema, Donovan (March 2005). The Economics of Historic Preservation: A Community Leader's Guide. National Trust for Historic Preservation. ISBN 9780891333883. OCLC 60858261.
