= Paul Robeson House (disambiguation) =

Paul Robeson House is a museum in Philadelphia, Pennsylvania, U.S., named after Paul Robeson (1898–1976)

Paul Robeson House may also refer to:

- Paul Robeson House, a hall of residence at SOAS, University of London, England
- Paul Robeson Residence, known as 555 Edgecombe Avenue, a National Historic Landmarked apartment building, Manhattan, U.S.

== See also ==
- Paul Robeson
