= Music Hall (disambiguation) =

Music hall is a form of British theatre.

Music Hall may also refer to:

== United Kingdom ==
- Music Hall, Aberdeen, Scotland
- Music Hall, Shrewsbury

== United States ==
- Music Hall (Buffalo, New York)
- Music Hall Center for the Performing Arts, Detroit, Michigan
- The Music Hall (Portsmouth), New Hampshire
- Music Hall (Clinton, New Jersey)
- Music Hall (Tarrytown, New York)
- Vail-Leavitt Music Hall, Riverhead, New York
- Music Hall (Cincinnati), Ohio
- Houston Music Hall, Houston, Texas
- Music Hall (Boston), Massachusetts
- Cohoes Music Hall, Cohoes, New York
- Music Hall (Milwaukee), Wisconsin

== Other countries ==
- The Music Hall (Sydney theatre), a former theatre-restaurant in Australia
- The Music Hall (Toronto), Canada
- Music Hall (Hanover), Germany
- MusicHall (Beirut), Lebanon

== Other uses ==
- Music Hall (film), a 1934 British musical drama film

== See also ==
- Radio City Music Hall, New York City, New York
