= Universal Preservation Hall =

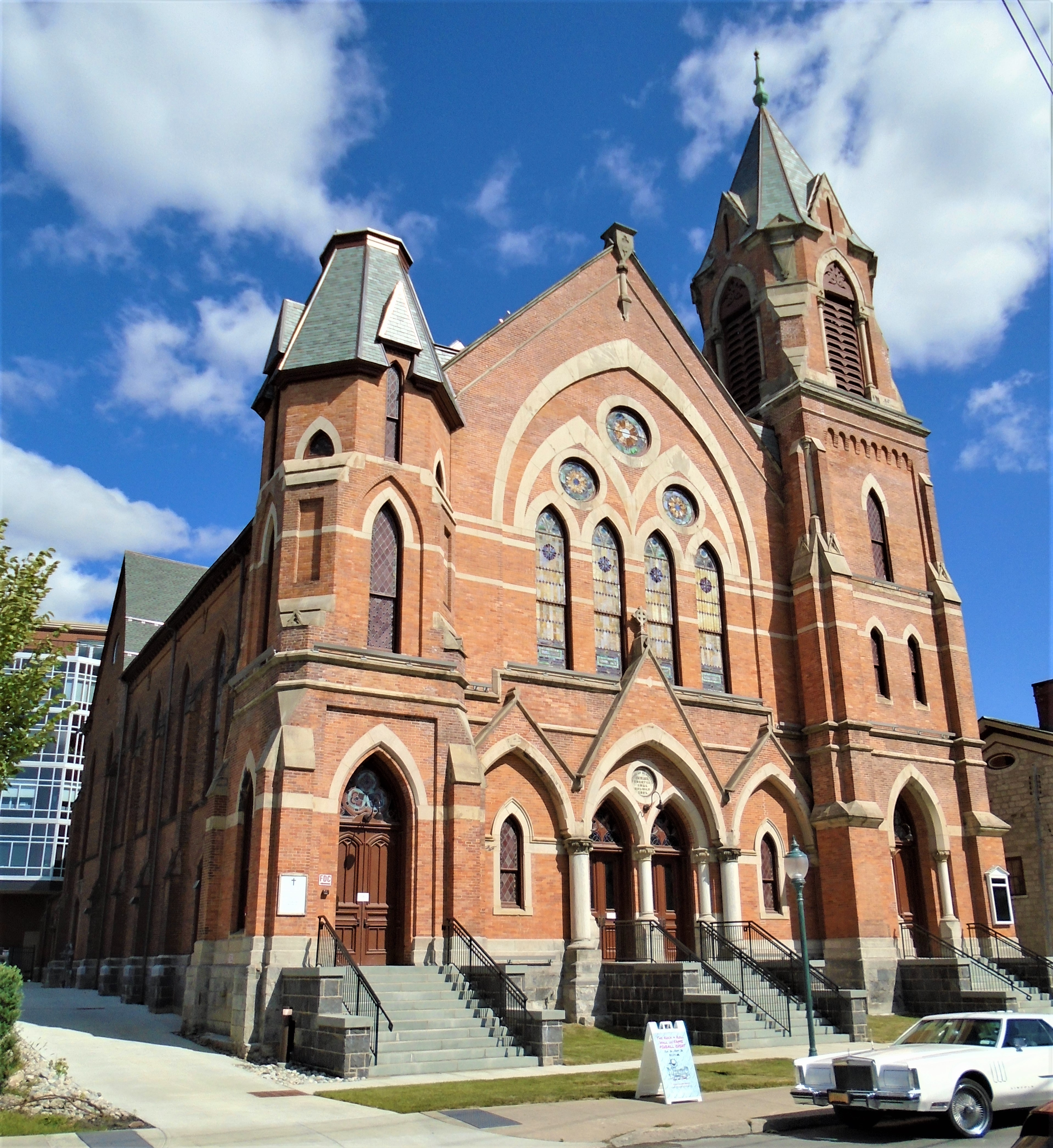
- (2020)
- Interactive map of Universal Preservation Hall
- Address: 25 Washington Street
- Location: Saratoga Springs, New York
- Coordinates: 43.080878°N 73.78742°W

Construction
- Built: 1871
- Renovated: in progress
- Architect: Elbridge Boyden

Tenant
- Universal Baptist Church

Website
- www.universalpreservationhall.org

The Universal Preservation Hall (UPH), located at 25 Washington Street in Saratoga Springs, New York, is a year-round arts and community events venue. It currently seats up to 700 and has a large, open, community room. It also houses the worship space for the Universal Baptist Church, a historically African-American congregation.

The building opened February 29, 2020 after being restored and re-fitted as a performance hall and rental venue. The Hall hosts a wide range of events from music to theatre, lectures, weddings, conferences, classes, and exhibits.

== History ==
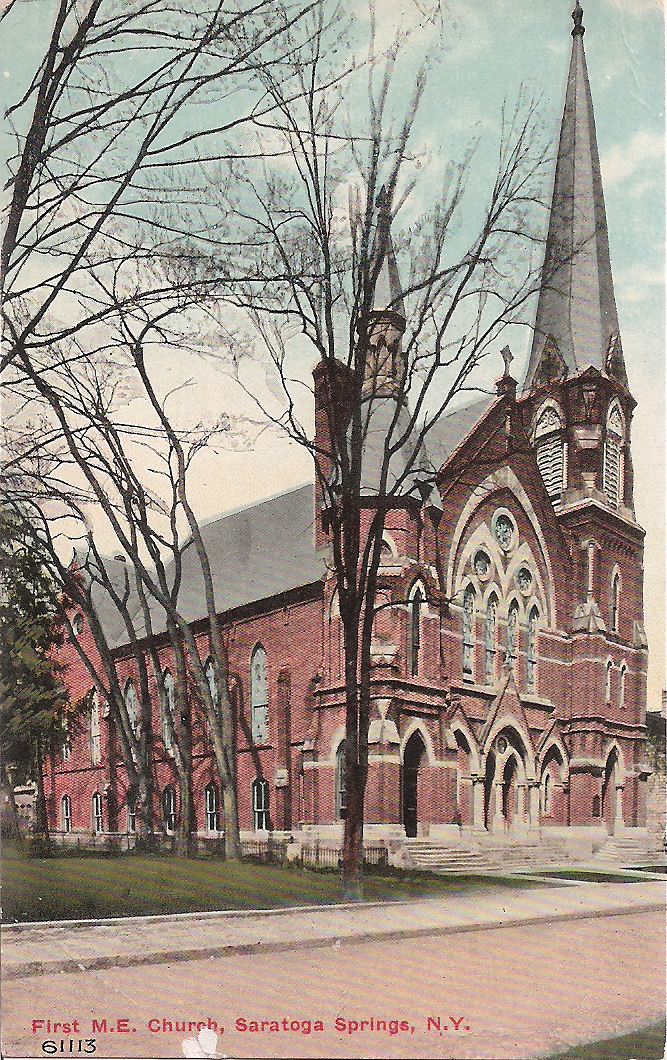
Postcard, date unknown, of the First Methodist Episcopal Church in Saratoga Springs

The Hall was built in 1871 as the First Methodist Episcopal Church, and designed by architects E. Boyden & Son. It is said to be one of the earliest and finest examples of High Victorian Gothic architecture anywhere in the country. Elbridge Boyden, borrowing from German and Italian Gothic Styles, contrasted the rose colored brick with light Ohio sandstone to define the pointed Gothic arches that frame the doors and windows. He used horizontal bands of this sandstone to unify the entire building. Inside, two walnut and ash staircases lead upstairs to the main theatre. The ceiling of this room is forty-five feet above the floor. The balcony, when in use, can seat two hundred and wraps around three sides of the auditorium. All of the supports that define the balcony and the ceiling beams feature Gothic arches that echo those in the tall, abstract, Tiffany-inspired, stained-glass windows in the room. The bell tower, which is the tallest structure in Saratoga Springs, houses a 3,000 pound Meneely bell cast in nearby Troy, New York.

Originally constructed for the Methodist church to host their annual regional meeting, the Hall has hosted politicians and activists including William Jennings Bryan, Henry Ward Beecher, Frederick Douglass, Senator Edgar T. Brackett and President William Howard Taft. In 1976 the Methodists sold the building to the Universal Baptist Church, who used it until the building’s deteriorating state made it unsafe; in 2000, the building was condemned. In 1999, citizens of Saratoga Springs joined with members of the Baptist Church to rescue the Hall from collapse. They formed a partnership to rebuild it as a performance and events center, while creating a separate worship space for the Baptists within the building. The new sanctuary for the Baptist Church was completed in 2004 and services are held there every Sunday.

Since the reconstruction began, the Hall has received donations from local individuals to kick off the reconstruction. It has also received support from The New York Landmarks Conservancy, the State of New York, the City of Saratoga Springs, the Adirondack Trust Company, The Swyer Foundation, The Universal Baptist Church, and The Saratoga Foundation. In 2006, Universal Preservation Hall was named an "Official Project" of Save America’s Treasures and received nearly $200,000 from the U.S. Federal Government.

Spearheaded by Jeff Pfeil, Tom Lewis, and Reverend Dr. Minnie Burns, repairs began in earnest in 2003. The wooden beams, which had almost completely failed due to water damage have been replaced with new steel structure. The floor of the balcony was rebuilt. The ceiling supports in the main auditorium were reconstructed using nineteenth century techniques and tools. Over two tons of waste have been removed from the building.

In 2015, the restoration effort entered into a "strategic alliance" with the Proctors Collaborative, which had rescued Proctor's Theatre in Schenectady, New York, and a further effort to upgrade the hall's lighting and sound and add an DA-compliant entrance stepped off in 2018.

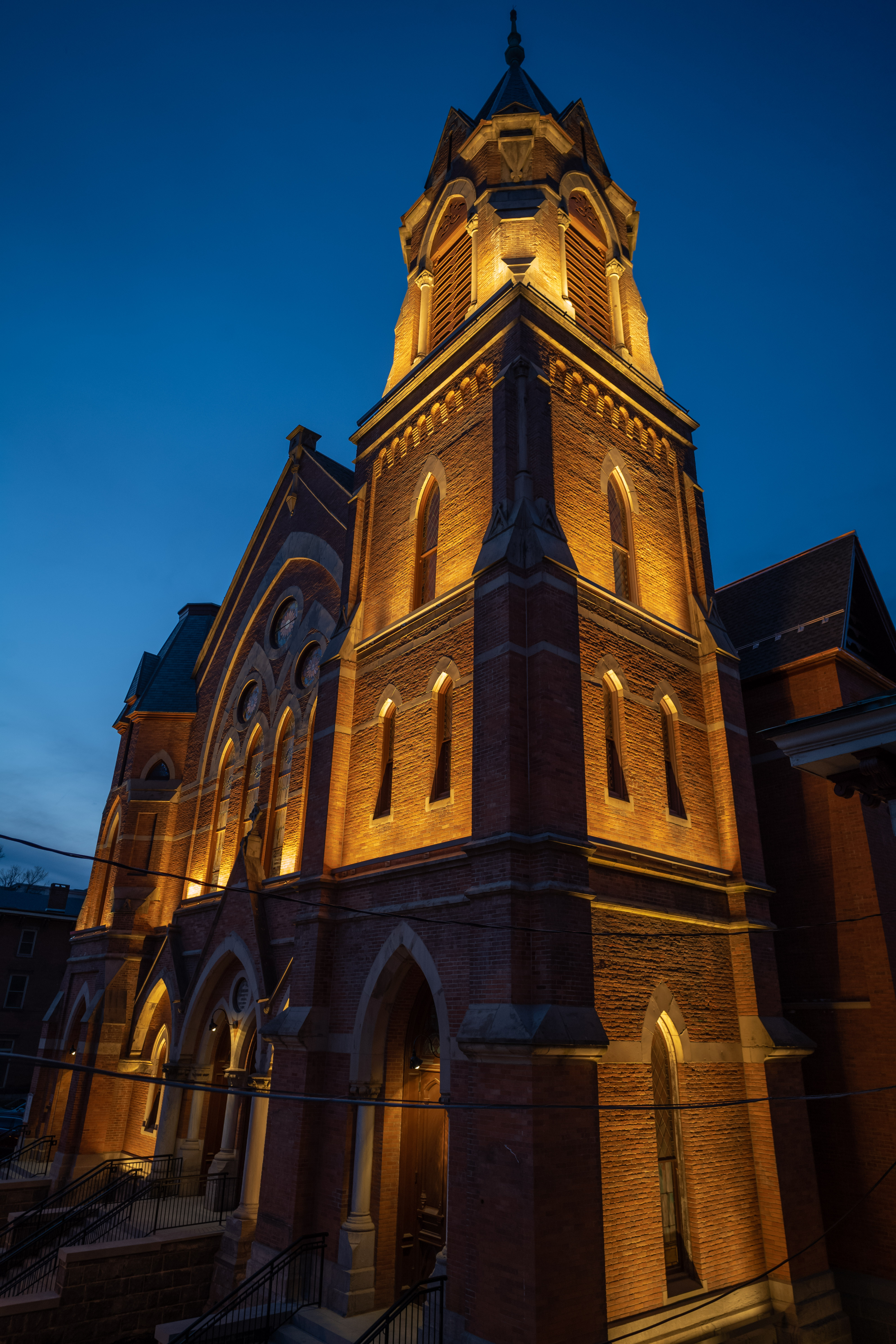
UPH exterior

On February 29, 2020, Rosanne Cash, with her band, performed to inaugurate the re-opening of UPH as a state-of-the-art performing arts venue.
