= Telluride Historic District =

Historic district in Colorado, United States

- U.S. National Register of Historic Places
- U.S. National Historic Landmark District
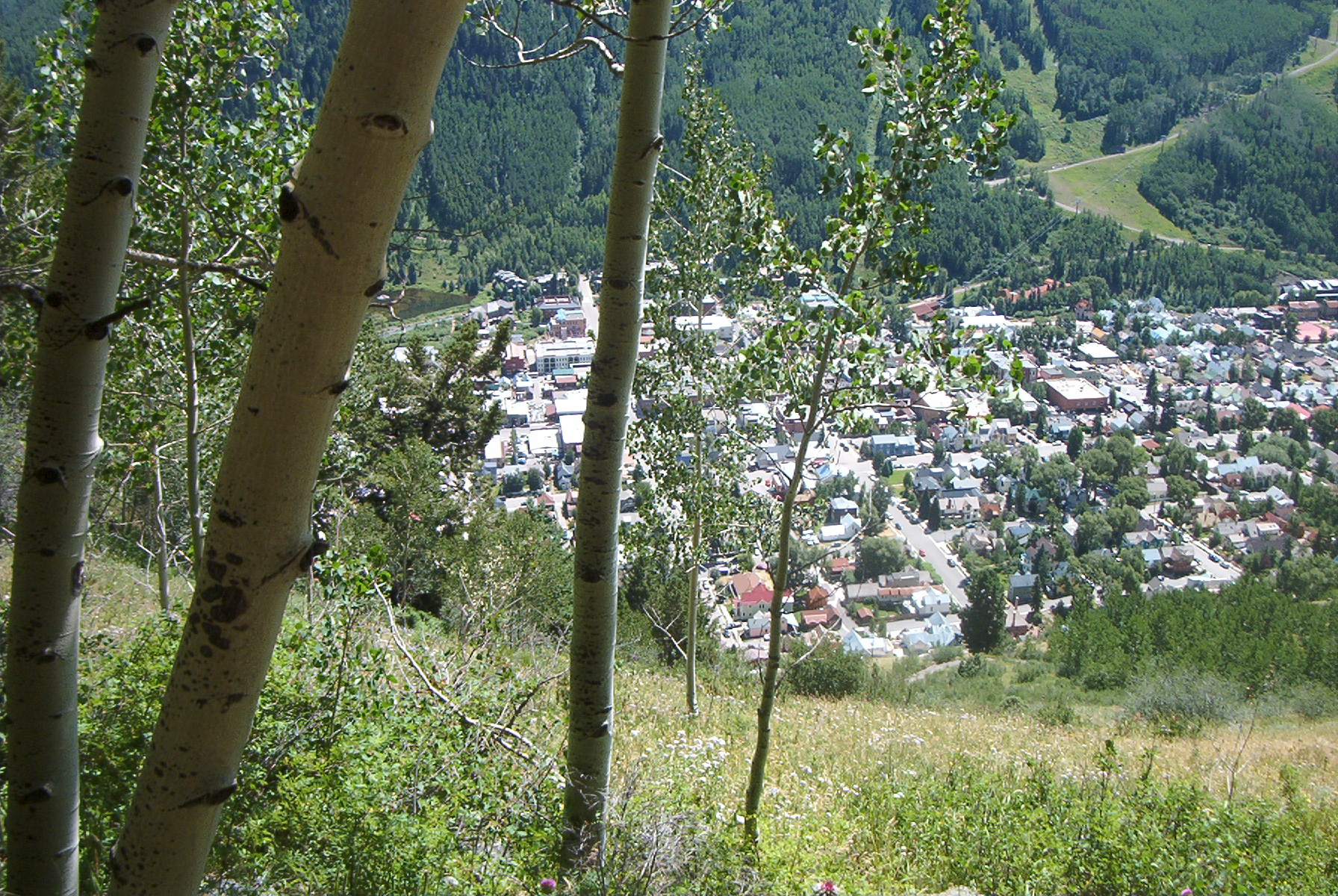
- Telluride from a hiking trail above, in 2005

- Location within Colorado Location within the United States
- Location: Rt. 145, Telluride, Colorado
- Coordinates: 37°56′14″N 107°48′29″W
- Area: 87 acres (35 ha)
- Built: 1878
- Architect: Multiple
- Architectural style: Late Victorian, Gothic Revival
- NRHP reference No.: 66000256

Significant dates
- Added to NRHP: October 15, 1966
- Designated NHLD: July 4, 1961

The Telluride Historic District encompasses a significant portion of the developed area of the former mining boom town of Telluride, Colorado. Telluride was founded in 1878, and was a major metals mining center until 1913. The historic district covers 80 acres (32 ha) of downtown Telluride and surrounding residential areas, as well as Lone Tree Cemetery, the town's first cemetery. It was declared a National Historic Landmark in 1961 for its well-preserved late boom-town architecture.

== Description and history ==
Telluride's history begins with the discovery of silver in the area in 1875, resulting in the creation of a large mining camp, which was incorporated in 1878. The city's importance as a mining center was cemented by the construction of a wagon road in 1882 and the arrival of the railroad in 1890, facilitating the transport of the mined ores to smelters further east. The arrival of the railroad also spurred a construction boom, resulting in much of the historic architecture seen in the city today.

The historic district includes most of Colorado Street, which serves as the city's main commercial avenue. The city was laid out in a manner typical of other boom towns, with higher-end housing on the slope above the main street, and lower class housing and industrial activities set below it, along with its red light district, gambling saloons, and the city jail. Distinctive surviving elements in the latter area include several bordello cribs, small wood-frame portable structures from which prostitutes plied their trade. Surviving along Colorado Street are several false front commercial buildings that survive from its early mining camp days.

== See also ==
- List of National Historic Landmarks in Colorado
- National Register of Historic Places in San Miguel County, Colorado
