= Paul Robeson House =

Museum in Philadelphia dedicated to Paul Robeson

- U.S. National Register of Historic Places
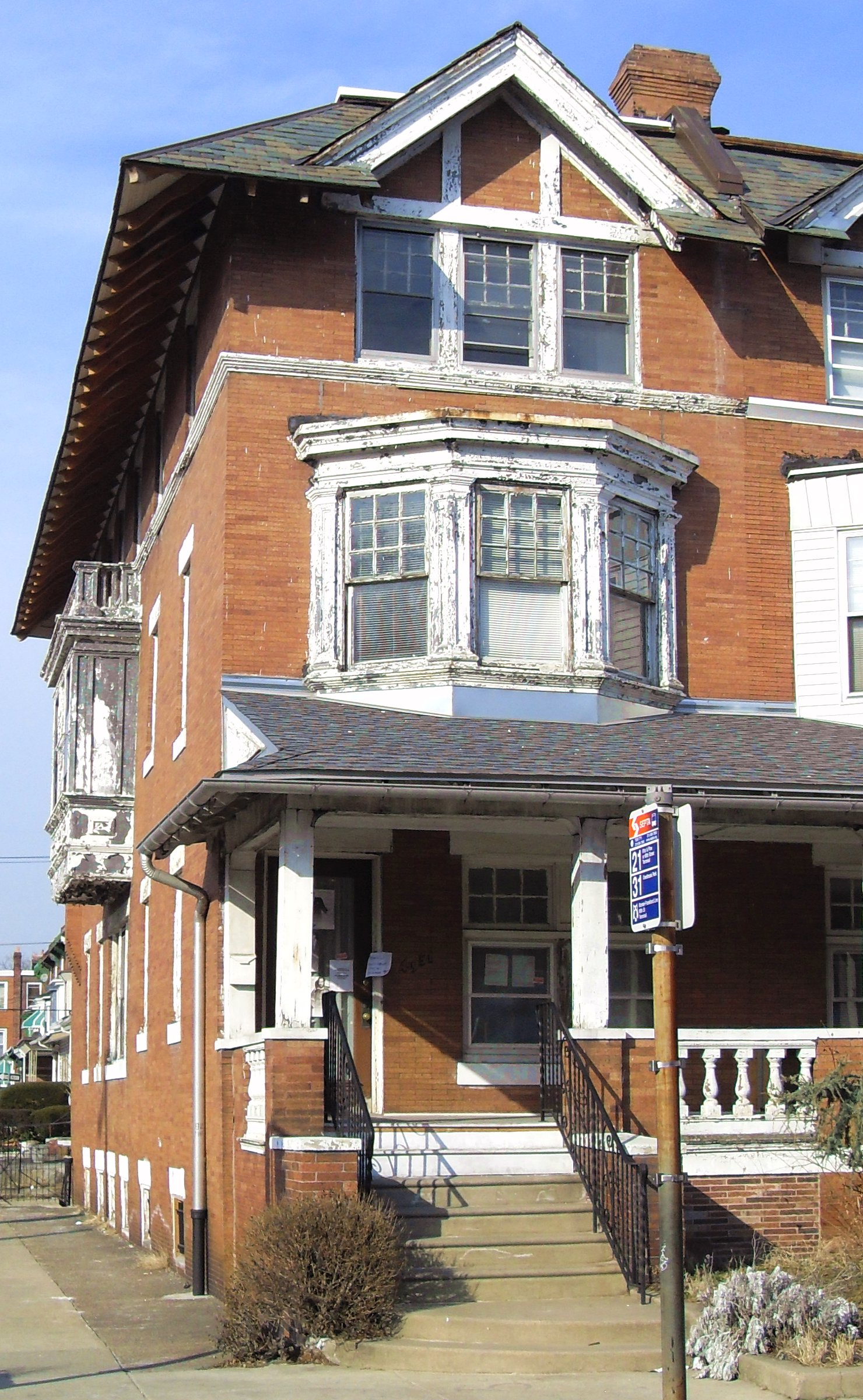
- 4951 Walnut Street (2009)

- Location within Philadelphia Location within Pennsylvania Location within the United States
- Location: 4951 Walnut Street, Philadelphia, Pennsylvania
- Coordinates: 39°57′24″N 75°13′17″W
- NRHP reference No.: 00001345
- Added to NRHP: November 22, 2000

The Paul Robeson House was the home of internationally renowned American bass-baritone concert singer, actor of film and stage, All-American and professional athlete, writer, multi-lingual orator, human rights activist, and lawyer Paul Robeson from 1966 until 1976. Located in West Philadelphia, the Robeson House produces, presents and promotes traveling lectures, concerts and exhibits.

== Background ==
Robeson lived in the Walnut Hill neighborhood of West Philadelphia from 1966 until 1976, with his sister Marian Forsythe. In declining health, Robeson spent his time in Philadelphia in retirement. He refused most interviews, and saw only family and a few friends.

In 1998 the West Philadelphia Cultural Alliance, under the direction of Ms. Frances Aulston, initiated a major campaign to restore the Paul Robeson House. Since then, the Pennsylvania Historical and Museum Commission and the White House have officially recognized the museum as a national historic preservation site.

The Paul Robeson House is an Official Project of Save America's Treasures public-private partnership between the White House Millennium Council and the National Trust for Historic Preservation.

It was added to the National Register of Historic Places in 2000. The "House" produces lectures, concerts and exhibits to promote Robeson's legacy.
