= Vail-Leavitt Music Hall =

- U.S. National Register of Historic Places
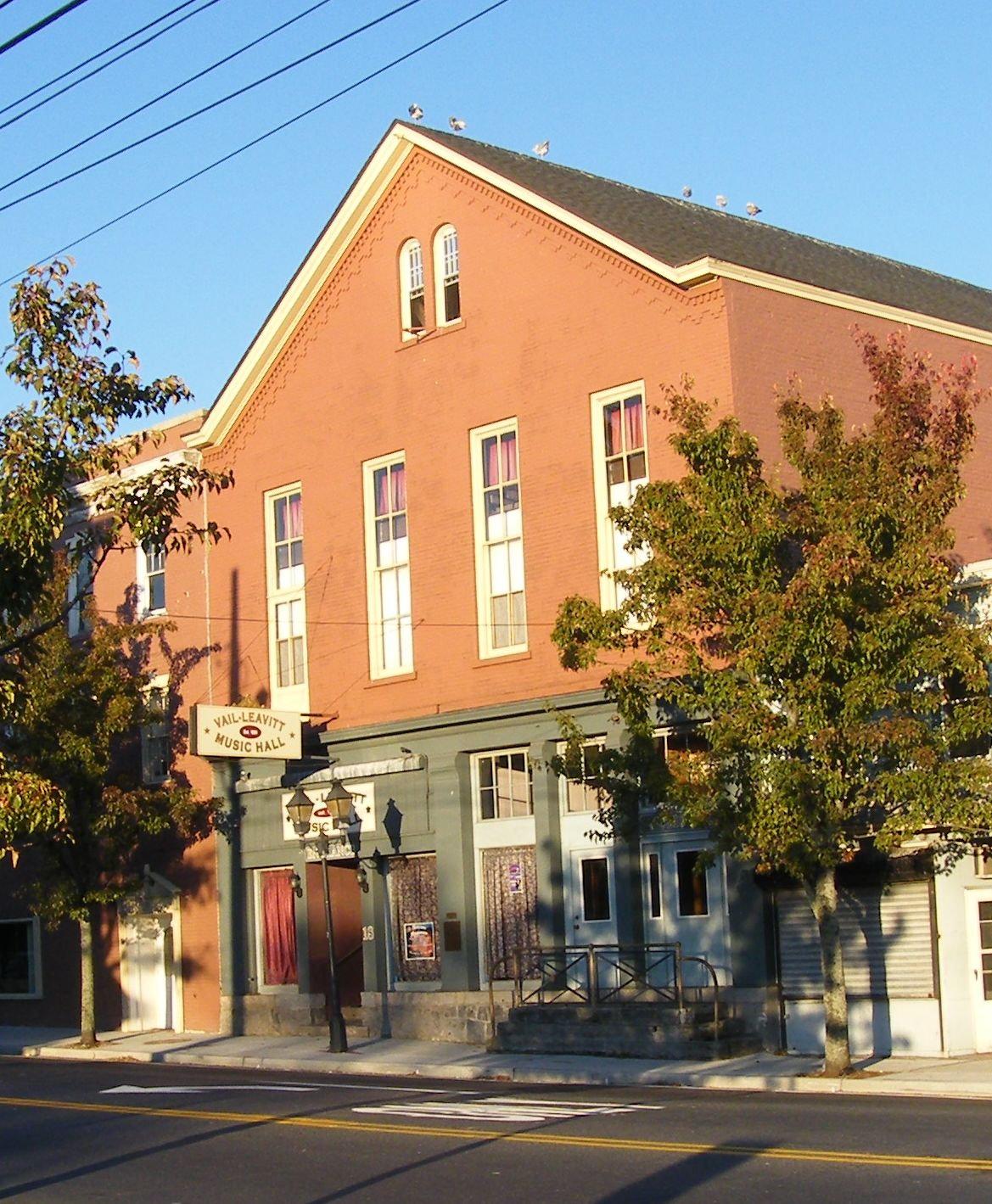
- Vail-Leavitt Music Hall

- Location within New York Location within the United States
- Location: 18 Peconic Avenue, Riverhead, Suffolk County, New York, US
- Coordinates: 40°54′59″N 72°39′45″W
- Built: 1881
- Architects: David F. Vail, George M. Vail
- Architectural style: Beaux-Arts
- NRHP reference No.: 83001809
- Added to NRHP: August 25, 1983

The Vail-Leavitt Music Hall is a late nineteenth-century theater presently in use on the east end of Long island in Riverhead, New York. The building was built by David F. Vail, with the help of his son George M. Vail in 1881. David was a local lumber dealer in the Riverhead and Eastern Suffolk County Long Island area.

The theater/music hall opened on October 11, 1881. The main theater and its balcony are a miniature opera house designed by J. W. Flack. The ground floor of the building housed commercial business storefronts, while the upstairs contained the opera house. The music hall began its operations with candle lighting, however the Vail's began operating a gas plant behind the theater. As a result, gas fixtures were placed all along the horseshoe balcony, and gaslight continued at the music hall until the advent of electricity to the area in July 1888, when the venue added electric lights.

In 1908, George M. Vail, now sole owner of Music Hall, sold the building to Simon Leavitt, a tailor and clothier, who leased out the upstairs as a theatrical venue. In 1914, the Music Hall was used by Thomas Edison as a demonstration site for kinetophone, an early attempt at the synchronization of sound and film.

As more modern theaters were built in the area, the Music Hall was converted for use over the years as a restaurant, a roller skating rink and even a betting parlor. However, the balcony and stage proscenium remained intact throughout the conversions. Eventually Theodore Leavitt (Simon's son) took over the clothier business and closed the upstairs, using it only as a storage area until his retirement in the 1970s.

After his death, Theodore Leavitt's widow Mollie Leavitt owned the music hall until its acquisition by the Council for the Vail-Leavitt Music Hall in 1982 through a grant from the U.S. Department of Housing and Urban Development arranged by the Town of Riverhead's Community Development officer, Robert Schemer. The Council is a not-for-profit 501(c)3 charitable corporation which now oversees and operates the venue.

From the early eighties to the late nineties, old movies were shown on a small screen in its downstairs space, dubbed the "Mini-Cine". These movie showings helped the theater raise monies for the music hall's restoration. The theater has been listed on the National Register of Historic Places since August 25, 1983.

The music hall held its grand re-opening on June 28, 2003. It continues to host numerous cultural, civic and charitable events throughout the year for the local community.

- Status: Open/Renovating/Restoring
- Screens: Single Screen
- Style: Beaux-Arts
- Function: Live Stage-Theater
- Seats: 300- with Balcony
- Chain: Independent
