= Pauline Lawrence =

American designer and musician in modern dance (1900–1971)

Pauline Lawrence Limón
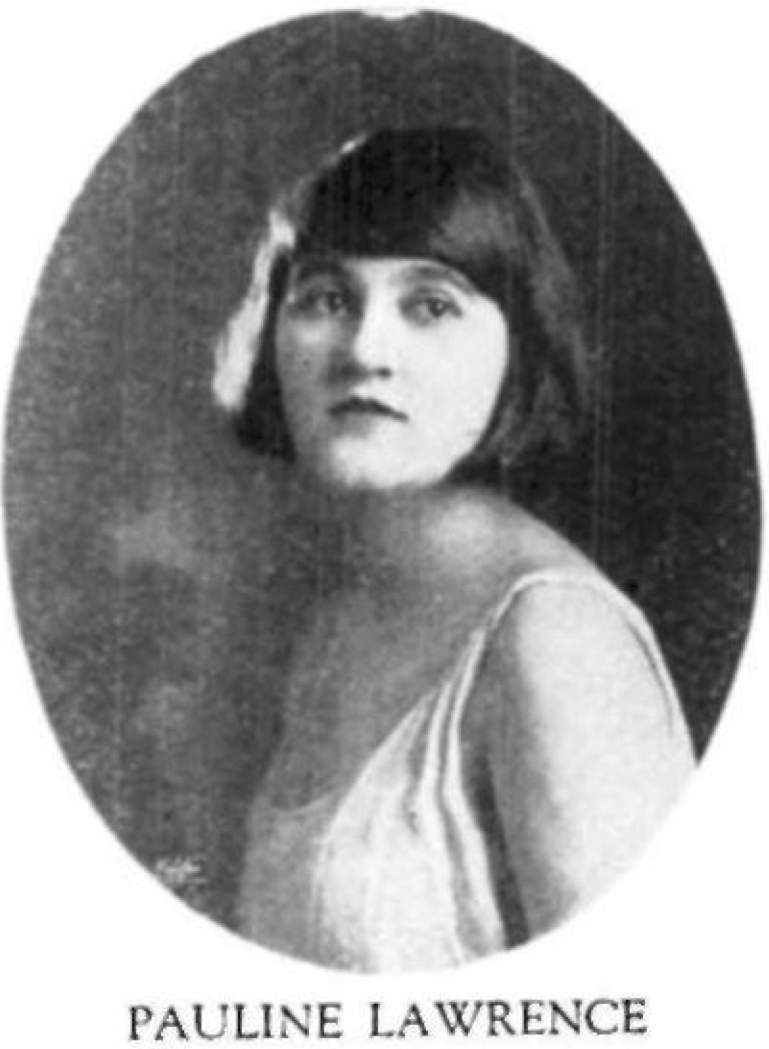
- Portrait in Denishawn Magazine, c. 1925
- Born: Pauline Lawrence; 1900; Los Angeles
- Died: July 16, 1971 (aged 70); Near Stockton, New Jersey
- Education: Hollywood High School
- Known for: Costume design
- Style: Modern dance
- Spouse: José Limón (m. 1941)

Pauline Lawrence Limón (née Lawrence; 1900 – July 16, 1971) was an American costume designer, choreographer, and musician in the field of modern dance. Lawrence was born in Los Angeles, and joined the Denishawn school at the age of 17. She was a founding member of the Humphrey-Weidman Group in 1928 and the José Limón Dance Company in 1945, and served in a variety of roles for both companies, including piano accompaniment, costume design, and company management. Lawrence married José Limón in 1941, and they collaborated professionally until her death in 1971.

== Early life and Denishawn ==
Pauline Lawrence was born in 1900 in Los Angeles. She attended Hollywood High School, graduating in 1917. At the age of 17, Lawrence began working at the Denishawn school in Los Angeles as a rehearsal pianist, under the supervision of two longtime Denishawn associates: composer Louis Horst and costumer Pearl Wheeler.

In addition to her work with the Denishawn school itself, Lawrence was also involved with the projects of Denishawn founders Ruth St. Denis and Ted Shawn. She was the accompanist for a national tour by the Ruth St. Denis Concert Dancers in 1919, and in 1921, Lawrence was the accompanist for the tour of Denishawn's Xochitl, a dance drama based on the story of Toltec empress Xochitl. With Denishawn, Lawrence also danced minor roles on tours and accompanied rehearsals in the studio.

== Humphrey-Weidman company ==
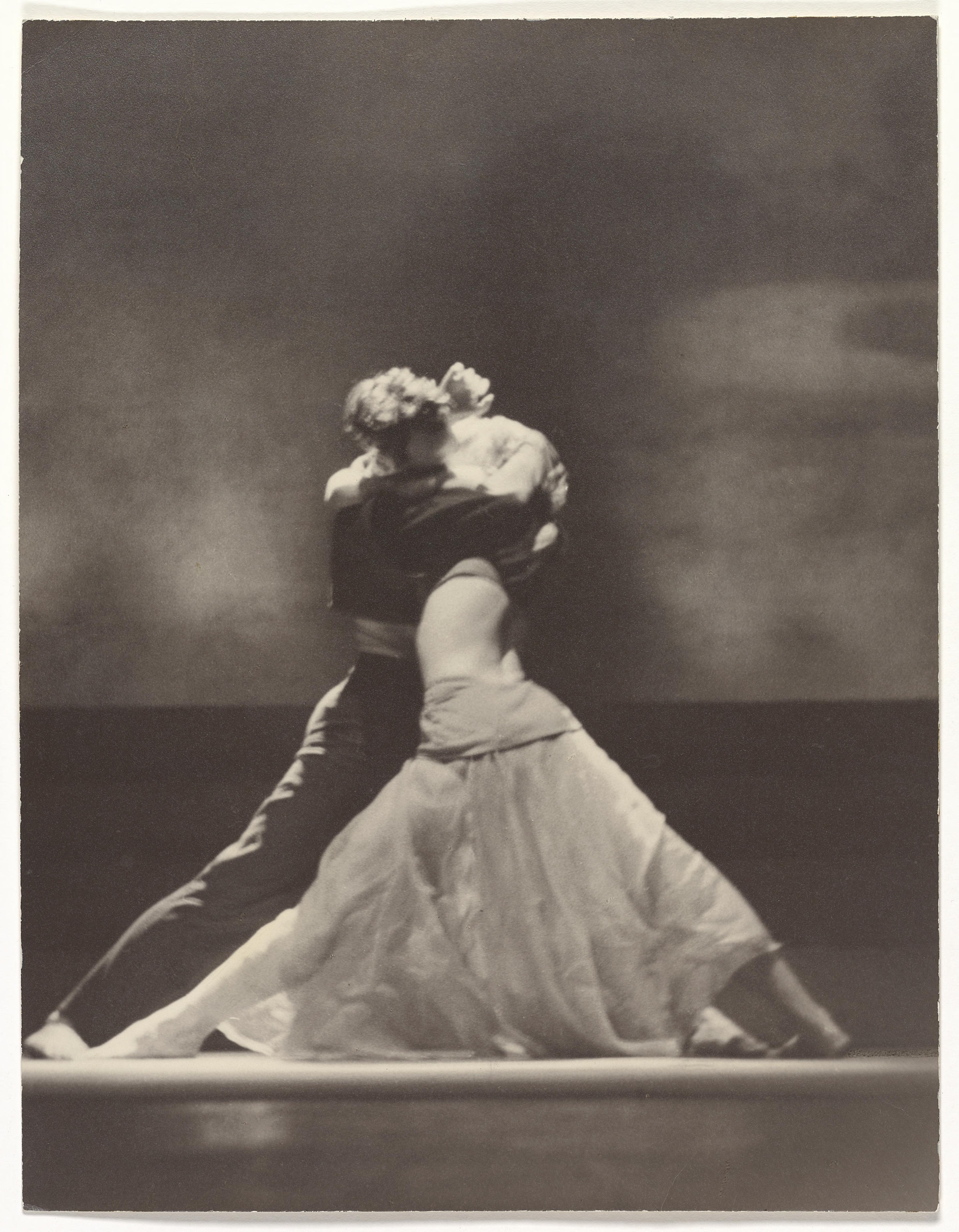
Charles Weidman and Katherine Litz in "With My Red Fires" (1936), costumed by Lawrence

Lawrence, Doris Humphrey, and Charles Weidman departed Denishawn in 1928 to form their own company, the Humphrey-Weidman Company. Lawrence, Humphrey, and Weidman objected to St. Denis' intention to limit the number of Jewish students in the school, and the Denishawn company was already nearing dissolution after the departures of key members Martha Graham and Louis Horst.

In addition to their philosophical and administrative objections to Shawn and St. Denis' company, the trio also wanted to pursue a more abstract and contemporary style in their work. According to St. Denis, Lawrence "was Doris’ Pearl [Wheeler] as well as her Louis [Horst], and who later took on the dignity of managership. And I think in these days Pauline felt very strongly that the only way Doris and Charles could expand was by separation from the forms of Denishawn."

In her venture with Humphrey and Weidman, Lawrence took charge of administrative, business, design, and technical matters, especially costuming. Humphrey-Weidmman company member Eleanor King described Lawrence's costuming for the company's inaugural performance as "uncanny in her sense of the fitness of things—the cut, texture, hue, shape and wearability of her costumes; the nuances of lighting; the suitability of the music. At all the external aids she was invaluable." Weidman designed and fabricated costumes for himself, and his and Lawrence's styles of costuming worked well together, with their shared use of bold colors and improvised materials.

== Collaboration with José Limón and later life ==
Lawrence met then-aspiring dancer José Limón in 1929, when he enrolled at the Humphrey-Weidman School. In the early 1930s, Lawrence lived with Doris Humphrey and her family, Charles Weidman, and Limón in a shared apartment in Greenwich Village. Contemporary scholars disagree about the nature of Lawrence and Humphrey's relationship before Humphrey's 1932 marriage: some argue that it was a sexual relationship, while others argue that it was a close friendship.

Regardless of the nature of Lawrence and Humphrey's relationship, their works in the field of early 20th-century modern dance were intrinsically linked with the topic of sexuality. Historian Julia L. Foulkes cited a 1931 letter from Lawrence to Humphrey in a 2002 analysis, which argued that "In general, sexual experimentation and relationships were common, probably more so among the New York modern dancers. ... They also espoused as their prophet the sexologist Havelock Ellis; in Pauline Lawrence's words, '[H]e sanctions me.' Ellis' sensual evocation of The Dance of Life linked sex, dancing, and love, imbuing all these acts with religious and artistic significance."

Lawrence and Limón were married on October 3, 1941 in San Francisco. Limón served in the United States Army beginning in 1943. After his discharge from the army, Lawrence and Humphrey joined him and Humphrey to create the José Limón Dance Company in 1945. Lawrence continued in her role from the Humphrey-Weidman company as costume designer and company manager, and Humphrey became the company's artistic director. Beginning in the 1960s, Lawrence stayed in her administrative and design positions, but relinquished some of the day-to-day operations of the company.

Lawrence and Limón purchased a property near Stockton, New Jersey in 1948. They renovated the property, a former dairy farm, into a house and a studio.

Lawrence died on July 16, 1971 at the age of 70 in her home near Stockton, New Jersey.

== Selected works and style ==
Lawrence designed costumes for many of the works of the Humphrey-Weidman Company, including all of its works choreographed by Humphrey from 1932 to 1944. A notable design by Lawrence for Humphrey-Weidman is seen in Water Study (1928), an iconic piece of the company's repertoire, which continues to be performed into the 21st century. Lawrence's costume design for Water Study, created within the constraints of the upstart company's small budget, features simple flesh-toned unitards for the dancers, integrating with the piece's abstract themes.

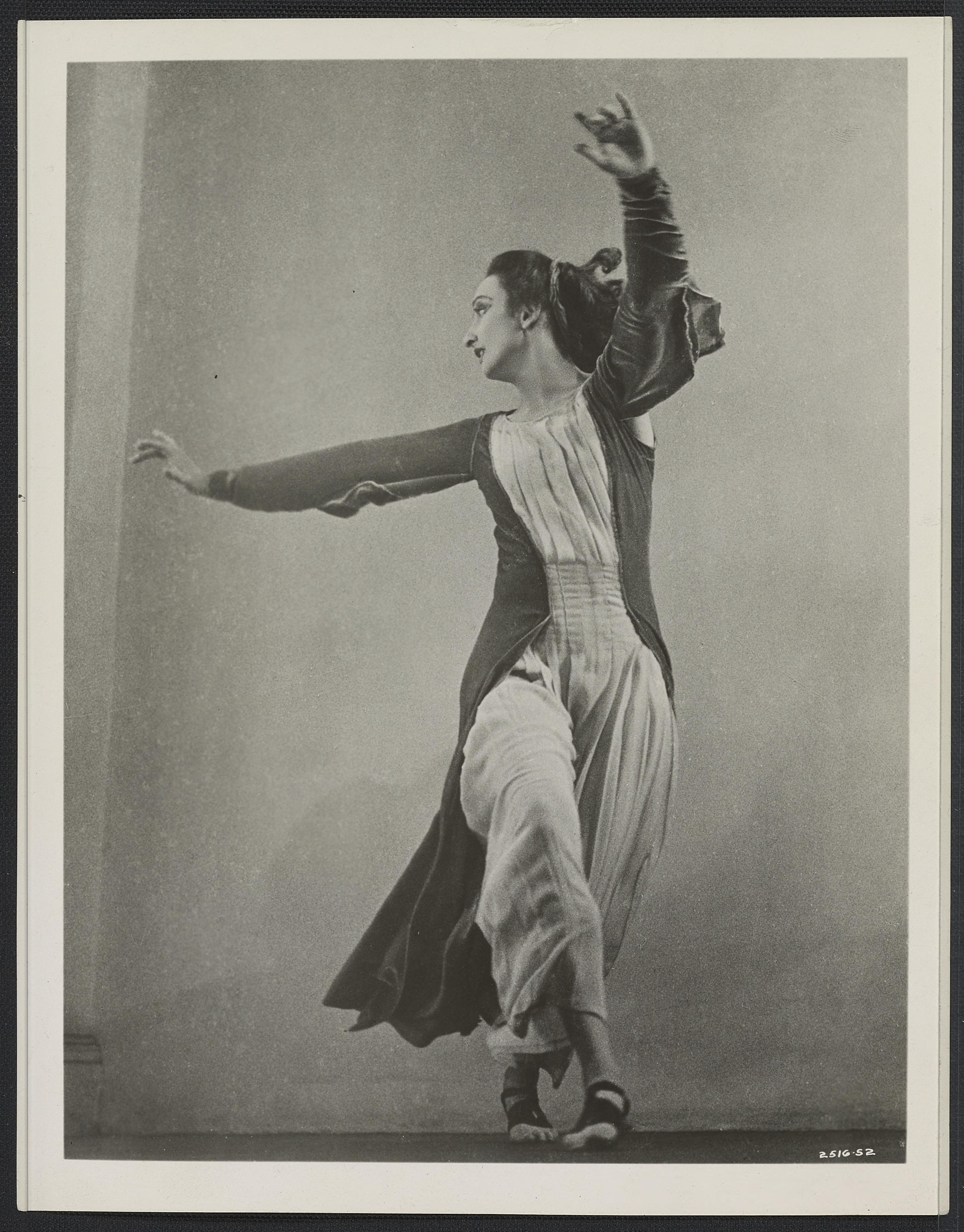
Doris Humphrey as the Matriarch in "With My Red Fires"

Another notable piece of work by Lawrence for the Humphrey-Weidman company is her costume design for the three-piece series New Dance (1935-36). "With My Red Fires," the final installment, examines themes of family, romantic love, and societal belonging, featuring three main characters: the Matriarch, a Young Woman, and a Young Man. "With My Red Fires" was praised by The New York Times dance critic John Martin, who described the character of the Matriarch as "the very personification of destroying love." Martin argued that the Matriarch's costume, featuring a massive gray skirt and long black sleeves, "echoed the daring of the role itself," fully evoking the intended themes of Victorian morality.

Beginning with her work with the Humphrey-Weidman company, Lawrence believed that costumes needed to be used as a fully integrated part of a performance, especially with lighting. In an October 1936 article in The Dance Observer, Lawrence argued that "the costumer should be a lighting expert, an artist with a skilled eye for line and texture, should know how interesting effects may be gained economically, but above all, should have the awareness and sensitivity to search out the meaning of each dance and complement that meaning without smothering or distorting it."

== See also ==
- Modern dance in the United States
