= Elizabeth Jennerjahn =

American artist and dancer (1923–2007)

- Born: June 11, 1923
- Died: March 3, 2007 (aged 83)
- Known for: Dance, textile art
- Movement: Black Mountain College

Elizabeth Schmitt Jennerjahn (June 11, 1923 – March 3, 2007) was an American artist and dancer. She was best known for her work as a dancer and dance instructor at Black Mountain College and later for her textile work and paintings.

== Life ==
Jennerjahn originally intended to be a stained glass artist and went to Black Mountain College in 1943 to study with Josef and Anni Albers. But after meeting Merce Cunningham, who taught for several summers at the North Carolina campus, she was drawn to dance and left to study with the Martha Graham Dance Company. She returned in 1948 with her husband, Warren P. (Pete) Jennerjahn, her college sweetheart, recent World War II veteran, and also an artist, but this time it was for dance. Jennerjahn eventually began teaching at the college herself, when she was promoted to staff rank in 1948 to teach eurhythmics ("Movement and Its Rhythmic Structure"). She went on to teach other classes as well, including "Modern Dance" and, together with Pete, a "Light Sound Movement" workshop focusing on multi-sensory experience. Jennerjahn was instrumental in recruiting Katherine Litz, who had been a dancer with the Humphrey-Weidman company and with Agnes de Mille, as well as a teacher at the Y.M.H.A. in New York, for the 1950 summer session

The first of five siblings to attend Black Mountain College, Jennerjahn and her husband eventually decided in 1951 to leave Black Mountain College because, according to Pete, the communal living of the College did not leave them much time together as a couple. After a year in Paris, where she studied dance and he studied art, they returned to the United States, settling in New York City, on the Lower East Side. Elizabeth continued dancing, achieving a near-professional level of skill, while Pete painted and taught at the Cooper Union and Hunter College. However, raising their young son, Hans, made increasing demands on her time, so Jennerjahn returned to visual art, in particular to textile design and painting. Her decision to teach art and then head the art department at the Long Island Waldorf School once again took time away from her artistic work, but she returned to it in retirement. Jennerjahn died at the age of 83, in the village of Oak Creek, Arizona.
