= Eleanor King =

American dancer (1906–1991)

- Dancing in her self-choreographed work "Hornpipe" in 1935
- Born: February 8, 1906; Middletown, Pennsylvania, U.S.
- Died: February 27, 1991 (aged 85); Haddonfield, New Jersey, U.S.
- Occupations: Modern dancer, choreographer, professor
- Years active: 1927–1991
- Dancing career
- Former groups: Humphrey-Weidman Dance Company; Theater Dance Company; Eleanor King Dance Repertory Company; American Dance Repertory Theater; University of Alabama, professor
- Website: www.ccdr.org

Eleanor Campbell King (1906–1991) was an American modern dancer, choreographer, and educator. She was a member of the original Humphrey-Weidman company, where she was a principal dancer in the pioneering modern dance movement in New York City, then moving on to choreography and founding her own dance company in Seattle, Washington. She was a professor emerita at the University of Arkansas, where she taught from 1952 to 1971, before retiring to Santa Fe, New Mexico, to start a new course of study into classical Japanese and Korean dance. She choreographed over 120 dance works, and wrote extensively for a variety of dance publications. In 1948, she was named Woman of the Year in Seattle, and in 1986 was listed as a "Santa Fe Living Treasure", also receiving the New Mexico Governor's Artist Award. In 2000, her archive was recognized by the White House Millennium Council's "Save America's Treasures" program.

== Biography ==
King was born on February 8, 1906, in Middletown, Pennsylvania, to George Ilgenfritz and Emma Kate Campbell King. She was the third of six children: Marion, George, Eleanor, Lucile, Robert and John. She attended Clare Tree Major School of the Theatre in 1925, and Theatre Guild School in 1926, studying dance with Doris Humphrey and Charles Weidman. Humphrey and Weidman had been involved with the pioneering Denishawn School in New York City, and then split off to form their own Humphrey-Weidman dance company. King began taking classes from them, and was then invited to be a part of the new dance company. She made her 1928 debut in Color Harmony, considered the first American abstract ballet. In 1930, she appeared in Leonide Massine's Sacre du Printemps at the Metropolitan Opera House. She stayed with the company until 1935, when she began soloing and choreographing. In 1937 she was a co-founder of the Theater Dance Company, and her first major work, Icaro, was produced in 1938. She became known for choreography based on works of literature, from Petrarch to James Joyce.

In 1942, she formed the Eleanor King Dance Repertory Company in Seattle, followed by the Eleanor King Dance Studio in 1945. In 1955, she studied mime with Étienne Decroux. In the late 1950s, she began studying Japanese Noh dances. Her first performance of these was in Tokyo in 1958. She created the Theatre of the Imagination program at the University of Arkansas, where she taught for much of her career, from 1952 to 1971. She was an assistant professor from 1952 to 1967, associate professor from 1967 to 1971, and was awarded professor emerita status in 1971. In her retirement, she moved to Santa Fe, New Mexico, and at age 70 began studying classic Korean dance.

In the 1980s revivals of her work were staged by Annabelle Gamson in 1987 and 1988 in New York. The solos were praised in The New York Times for their "eloquence and for Miss King's careful shaping of ideas and feelings".

== Death ==
King was a member of the Congress on Research in Dance, and director of Mino Nicolas' American Dance Repertory Theater, a position she held until her death on February 27, 1991, aged 85, in Englewood, New Jersey.

== Writing ==
- Transformations: The Humphrey-Weidman Era (Memoir), Dance Horizons (Brooklyn, NY), 1978
- King, Eleanor. The Way of Japanese Dance: an Illustrated Journal, 1982 (unpublished)
- (started) Transformations II: To The West

== Eleanor King Trust ==
The Eleanor King Trust was founded by Andrea Mantell-Seidel, dancer/educator, who was King's primary protégé for 18 years. The Trust was formed to preserve and promote the work of Eleanor King. Trustees include:

- Dr. Joann Kealiinohomoku, executive director, Cross-Cultural Dance Resources
- Daniel Lewis, Dean of New World School of the Arts, Dance Division
- Nicole Plett, Dance Critic, The New York Times

== Archives ==
In 2000, King's archived collection of work was recognized by President Clinton's White House Millennium Council, under the Save America's Treasures project. The materials, including 60 years of manuscript material, correspondence, personal papers, drawings, photographs, slides, costumes, books, articles, and reviews are being preserved by Cross-Cultural Dance Resources, a non-profit dance research organization in Flagstaff, Arizona. In 2008, it was announced that the collection was going to be moved to the Herberger College of the Arts at Arizona State University in Tempe, Arizona, for permanent curation. 49 boxes of the King Collection are also available at the New York Public Library for the Performing Arts. The Music Division at the Library of Congress holds the Cherie Jorgenson Collection on Jane Grossenbacher and Eleanor King

== Awards ==
- Jane Cowl Romeo and Juliet Essay Contest, gold medal, 1923
- Bennington School of the Dance, fellowship, 1938
- "Woman of the Year", Seattle, 1948
- Fulbright research grants, 1967, 1976, 1977
- American Association of Dance Companies, honoree, 1975
- Vogelstein Foundation grant, 1976
- Santa Fe Dance Umbrella, 1980
- Santa Fe Living Treasure, 1986
- New Mexico Governor's Award for Excellence in the Arts, 1987
- National Endowment for the Arts Fellowship, 1988

== Sources ==
- International Dictionary of Modern Dance, St. James Press (Detroit, Michigan), 1998
- Jowitt, Deborah,Village Voice, March 13, 1991 (obituary)
- Cass, Joan, Dancing through History, Englewood Cliffs, New Jersey, 1993
- Plett, Nicole (1988). Eleanor King, Sixty Years in American Dance. University of New Mexico Press. ISBN 0-8263-1028-1.
- Anderson, Jack (1988-06-12). "Eleanor King Retrospective". The New York Times.
- Marquis Who's Who, 2007
- Dunning, Jennifer (1989-03-11). "Review/Dance; Recalling the Spirit of Doris Humphrey". The New York Times.
- "Eleanor King". Cross-Cultural Dance Resources. Archived from the original on 2008-05-09.
- Kealiinohomoku, Joann (2003-06-08). "The Eleanor King Legacy Rediscovered". Proceedings: CCDR's Symposium: Applying Dance Ethnology and Dance Research in the 21st Century. Cross-Cultural Dance Resources.
- "CCDR Eleanor King Collection". Cross-Cultural Dance Resources. Archived from the original on 2008-05-09.
