= Hartford Symphony Orchestra =

American orchestra

- Orchestra
- Former name: Civic Symphony Orchestra of Hartford
- Founded: 1934; 92 years ago
- Location: Hartford, Connecticut, United States
- Concert hall: The Bushnell Center for the Performing Arts
- Music director: Carolyn Kuan
- Website: hartfordsymphony.org

The Hartford Symphony Orchestra (HSO) is an American orchestra based in Hartford, Connecticut.

== History ==
=== 1930s ===
The orchestra was established in 1934 as the Civic Symphony Orchestra of Hartford with support from a federal relief programme. Francis Goodwin II was involved in its establishment. The orchestra gave its first concert on November 20, 1934, at West Middle School in Hartford, conducted by music director Angelo Coniglione.

The Federal government disbanded the Federal Emergency Relief Corporation in 1935 and instead began a larger program called the Federal Music Project (FMP). This project was a subdivision of the Works Progress Administration (WPA) of the New Deal. Many orchestras in the United States were born out of the funding from this project. After the federal relief programme ended in 1935, the orchestra received support through the Federal Music Project, a programme of the Works Progress Administration. This enabled the orchestra to increase musicians' wages and charge admission.

Jacques Gordon succeeded Coniglione as music director in 1936, when the orchestra adopted the name Hartford Symphony Orchestra. Its schedule expanded to include performances at The Bushnell and other venues in Connecticut, Massachusetts and Rhode Island. Changes to Federal Music Project funding subsequently required the orchestra to obtain a greater share of its funding independently.

The orchestra withdrew from the Federal Music Project in 1938 and appointed Léon Barzin as music director. The following year, the City of Hartford funded five summer concerts conducted by George Heck.

=== 1940s ===
Ever since the decision was made to forgo federal funding in 1938, the Hartford Symphony had been struggling to keep its doors open. Board member Francis Goodwin, considered to be the “Father of the Hartford Symphony,” even put up $11,000 in personal collateral to finance a loan for the symphony. (The symphony was later unable to pay back the loan, and Goodwin's personal collateral was confiscated.) Despite this financial distress, the Hartford Symphony presented five concerts in the Bushnell which featured all-Beethoven programming. These concerts marked the highest attendance the orchestra had experienced in its six-year history.

The Hartford Symphony played the last of its successful Beethoven concerts on May 14, 1941. By this time, World War II had swept through Europe, and by the fall of 1941 nearly all of the Hartford Symphony's musicians had taken leave to join the armed forces. With crippled finances and no musicians, the orchestra only existed as a corporate entity and it did not seem likely that Connecticut would ever hear the Hartford Symphony again.

In a final effort to save the Hartford Symphony, Francis Goodwin pulled together a new board of directors in 1946 composed of prominent Hartford businessmen, including Willard B. Rogers, the commissioner of the Connecticut Department of Economic and Community Development, as president of the Hartford Symphony Board.

In an unprecedented action, Hartford's musicians’ union agreed to perform for free for one year in an effort to get the symphony up and running again. The Hartford Symphony was then free to use what little funds they had to pay for technical costs. In 1947 they hired two alternating co-conductors: George Heck, Dean of what is now the Hartford Conservatory, and Moshe Paranov, Dean of The Hartt School.

The Hartford Symphony's first concert back was held on January 25, 1948, in Mortensen Hall. For the first time, patrons could buy subscriptions ($6 for seats at four concerts in either the Orchestra or Front Balcony section) or pay $1 per concert for a seat in the rest of the house. The audiences were much larger than the symphony had seen in the past, with more than 1,000 paid admissions at every concert. After observing this heartfelt struggle to revive the Hartford Symphony, Travelers Insurance Company, in conjunction with radio station WTIC-FM, offered up a generous gift of $30,000 over the course of three years to the Hartford Symphony. After the first $10,000 installment in 1948, the HSO was finally able to open official administrative offices in the first floor of the Old State House, and, more importantly, was able to pay the musicians scale wages.

The Hartford Symphony's 1949–1950 concert season expanded to six concerts in the Bushnell instead of four. In addition, Arthur Fiedler guest conducted the first Hartford Symphony Pops! concerts at The Bushnell and the Trinity Field House, where audience members sat at cabaret-style tables and were served food and drink by white-coated Trinity Students. It was noted this year that the orchestra played better than ever before; it seemed that musicians and audience members alike had a renewed interest in keeping the Hartford Symphony in business.

=== 1950s ===
After the financial growth of the 1940s, the Hartford Symphony was able to perform six traditional concerts in The Bushnell with several nationally and internationally renowned guest performers, including Walton Deckelman, piano; Bela Urban, violin; Joseph De Pasquale, viola; Seymour Benstock, cello; and Cynthia Otis, harp. Odell Shepard, a former lieutenant governor of Connecticut, was even invited to narrate Aaron Copland’s A Lincoln Portrait.

The symphony decided that Fritz Mahler would soon replace Moshe Paranov and George Heck as the new conductor of the Hartford Symphony, with a salary of $7,500 per year. At first, the public was very upset over the decision to hire Fritz Mahler; local newspapers slammed the symphony for firing the two former Hartford Symphony conductors. On October 28, 1953 Fritz Mahler conducted his first concert with the Hartford Symphony in a program that featured the Boston Symphony’s principal cellist, Samuel Mayes, premiering Kabalevsky’s Concerto for Cello. Although the concert was well attended, there was still backlash from press about new conductor.

Determined to see the Hartford Symphony expand and flourish, Mahler developed educational and outreach programs. He began his series of “Young People’s Concerts” at The Bushnell, and appointed Mrs. Rena Oppenheimer as Educational Director. She traveled to local grade schools to present instrument demonstrations and promote the “Young People’s Concerts.” Mahler also started the “Hartford Little Symphony”- a reduced orchestra that would play run-out concerts at Avon Old Farms School, Miss Porter’s School, the Duffy School, and the Verplank School.

Mahler infused a sense of variety into the symphony's programming with performances of Prokofiev’s Alexander Nevsky, J. Strauss’ Die Fledermaus, an all-Tchaikovsky program, a performance of “Show Boat,” two Pops! concerts, and a program entitled “Theater in the Dance,” featuring the José Limón Dancers with Pauline Koner (Mrs. Fritz Mahler) as a soloist. In 1954, the orchestra performed the American premiere of Carl Orff's Carmina Burana. It recorded the work for Vanguard Records in 1957.

On March 27, 1957, the symphony recorded Carmina Burana on the Vanguard record label. Fritz Mahler continued the Hartford Symphony's recording project with the Vanguard label, recording three new albums: Berlioz's Requiem, Gustav Mahler’s Das Klagende Lied, and Bloch’s Three Jewish Poems for Orchestra and Copland’s Variations for Orchestra & Fanfare for the Common Man.

=== 1960s ===
The sixties opened with a general sense of uneasiness amongst the Hartford Symphony administration over the symphony’s lack of growth in the past few years. Newly elected Hartford Symphony President Francis Goodwin, who is considered to be the “Father of the Hartford Symphony,” was determined to make the Hartford Symphony the “really great orchestra” he had always dreamed it could be. Although the symphony had received local accolades for its recent accomplishments, it had not yet reached the status Goodwin felt it could achieve.

The Hartford Times and Hartford Courant gave mediocre reviews to the symphony's opening concerts of the 1961–62 season; more people began to subscribe to the Bushnell's concert series instead of the symphony's because they believed the Hartford Symphony's performances were mediocre in comparison. Insisting that they would be able to provide better programming if more funds were available, Goodwin initiated a new fundraising campaign, headed by former symphony president Albert Holland. The campaign was a great success: the orchestra raised $100,000 in one year.

Although the public was enamored with everything Music Director Fritz Mahler had done for the symphony, the general consensus within the administration and musicians was that Mahler was no longer a good fit for the HSO. Mahler was constantly traveling overseas to conduct foreign orchestras and seemed no longer committed to the growth of the symphony. When it became apparent that the board wanted to hire a new conductor, the public was outraged. Despite growing controversy over removing Mahler, Goodwin and the board announced that they wanted to hire a new music director – someone who played an instrument, who would hire local players, and, most importantly, who would commit themselves to the nitty-gritty business details of the orchestra. After conducting a wide-sweeping national search, they picked Arthur Winograd, the founding cellist of the Juilliard Quartet, to be the symphony's new music director. The symphony rose to a new level under Winograd. Concerts for the 1965–66 season were packed and the symphony saw a 15% increase in subscriptions, surpassing the Bushnell's subscription sales.

In 1966, the orchestra received a $1.35 million grant through the Ford Foundation's programme for performing arts organisations.

In 1967, the orchestra performed at Lincoln Center and Carnegie Hall in New York City.

=== 1970s ===
Despite the fantastic successes of the 1960s, the Hartford Symphony was listed by the New York Times as one of 12 American orchestras in serious financial “danger.” The HSO had experienced great ticket sales and generous donations during the 1960s, but operating costs were high and financial failure was imminent once again. The Ford Challenge Grant which had been awarded to the HSO ten years prior stipulated that the HSO needed to raise one million dollars on their own in order for Ford to donate the $1,350,000 award. At the end of 1971, the symphony was $140,000 short of the one million dollar requirement, even though Ford's award money had been built into future budgets. At the last minute, Symphony supporters Francis Goodwin and Harry Robinson each donated $70,000 to the HSO, allowing the orchestra to meet its goal and continue to provide classical music to the City of Hartford.

Financially steady for the first time, the Hartford Symphony expanded their educational series to include four “Young People’s Concerts” in the Bushnell, a “Junior Symphony Series” for junior high students, and a concert series at Connecticut College. These years also brought in the world's most celebrated soloists, including Benny Goodman, Mitch Miller, Isaac Stern, Leon Fleisher, a young André Watts, Itzhak Perlman, Van Cliburn, Ella Fitzgerald, and a 19-year-old Yo-Yo Ma.

In 1976, the symphony presented a special Bicentennial series, featuring popular and brand-new American music on every program. This year also marked the passing of Francis Goodwin, who truly had devoted his life to creating and sustaining the Hartford Symphony.

In October 1978, the musicians went on strike, protesting the reductions of concerts and rehearsal hours. The strike lasted ten days, and ended in late October.

In 1979, the symphony hired Richard Hayman to conduct the Pops! Series at the Jai-alai Fronton in Hartford. With Hayman's appointment came new, innovative Pops! programming, including the incorporation of rock ‘n roll, modern jazz, and international music into the series.

=== 1980s ===
The Hartford Symphony continued to bring in the finest guest soloists from around the world, including Andre Watts, piano; Richard Stoltzman, clarinet; Jean-Pierre Rampal, flute; Itzhak Perlman, violin; Emmanuel Ax, piano; and Tony Bennett. Throughout the eighties, the symphony would expand and create original new concert series, starting these first couple of years with a Beethoven Festival, “Symphony on Ice,” and “Spring, con Amore.”

After leading the HSO for 20 years, Music Director Arthur Winograd announced that this would be his final season. After a year of stunning performances of works by De Falla, Bartók, Shostakovich, and Berlioz, and guest artists including cellist Mstislav Rostropovich, Winograd handed off his baton. As a search committee combed the country for the new conductor, the 1985 season continued on with a series of guest conductors, including Michael Lankester, an exciting British conductor who was associate conductor of the Pittsburgh Symphony. Lankester thoroughly impressed the symphony and the public; the next year he was appointed as the new music director of the HSO.

Lankester brought in a new wave of interesting guest artists and adventurous programming, including pianist Horatio Guttierez and 13-year-old violinist Midori, as well as performances of works by Britten, Ives, Rorem, and Harbison. This season was bigger than ever, with Classical and Pops! programs, a new “Discovery” and “Music to Go” series, and community concerts at local high schools. In order to accommodate all these new concerts, the musicians ratified a new contract allowing for 21 full-time “core” musicians who were paid a salary instead of per service. Lankester set a new programming standard, pairing modern, avant-garde music by composers like Martinu, Walton, and Kolb with more traditional works, including Verdi's Requiem. Ticket sales were outstanding, and the symphony continued to grow.

Although the symphony's audiences were thrilled with the increase in concerts, the musicians were being pushed to play more than they ever had before. Many of the “core” musicians had experienced performance injuries, and there were ambiguities with pay rates between orchestra members. All performances came to a grinding halt during an 11-week impasse; at the end of the year the HSO finally negotiated new contracts where the work schedule became much more reasonable. The Hartford Symphony opened its doors once again on January 18, 1989. After that, it seemed that Hartford's thirst for classical music could not be quenched. This year the symphony started five new series: “Classical Conversations,” “Symphonikids” in-school concerts, Family concerts, a completely sold out series in local churches called “Music in a Gothic Space,” and a brand new set of summer concerts.

=== 1990s ===
Hartford Symphony Music Director Michael Lankester continued to grow the orchestra's presence in the Hartford community by starting the “Classical Conversations” series, a program designed to help familiarize HSO audiences with the personal lives of their beloved composers. Lankester expanded the Family and Children's Concerts, even writing much of the music for these programs himself.

Ever since the 1988 contract negotiations there had been tension between the musicians and the administration, and in 1991 the problems finally came to a head. As the result of a contract dispute, the orchestra hit a work impasse and the symphony was forced to cancel the 1991–92 season. Fourteen months later, a compromise was reached and the HSO went back to work.

After the cancellation of the 1991–92 season, new subscriptions were low and the prospects of a 1992–93 season looked shaky. In the face of this challenge, the HSO got creative, not despondent. With budget and staff restructuring and greater initiative by the musicians, the orchestra pulled through and kept music in Hartford. The symphony opened its 50th-anniversary season in 1993 with a fanfare written by Maestro Lankester.

Where there had been tension and dispute, now the musicians, board, and staff were working hand in hand to keep the symphony alive. The symphony initiated new fundraising efforts to expand endowment, increase subscriptions, and balance the budget. This year the HSO began a new chamber orchestra series, the “Signature Series.”

In 1996, the HSO held its first trial season of the HSO’s summer series, the Talcott Mountain Music Festival.

In 1997 the HSO finally worked its way back to achieving a balanced budget after the financial and administrative struggles earlier that decade. This recovery was due not only to increasingly effective marketing, but also to steady growth in the orchestra's artistic quality, balanced programming, increased emphasis on music and cultural education, and fresh, skillful, and professional management.

The HSO opened the 1997–98 season with a Masterworks concert featuring Stravinsky's oratorio, Oedipus Rex, with a massive choir and a theatrical stage set. This year's guest artist roster included pianists Leon Fleisher and Garrick Ohlsson, cellist Ralph Kirshbaum, and actor Christopher Plummer.

Michael Lankester announced in 1999 that he would be leaving the HSO. To celebrate the retirement of their music director, the symphony invited some of the greatest artists of the time to perform, including Yo-Yo Ma, Yefim Bronfman, Marvin Hamlisch, Krystof Penderecki, Ute Lemper, and Captain Kangaroo. At the close of this tumultuous decade, the symphony turned an eye to the future and began the search for the new leader of Connecticut's orchestra.

=== 2000s ===
The HSO launched a major community initiative in 2000 designed to reach new audiences with “I Have a Dream,” the HSO's first concert celebrating the life and legacy of Martin Luther King Jr., and named for his 1963 "I Have a Dream" speech. In addition, the orchestra was invited for the first time to tour with the popular tenor Andrea Bocelli; together they performed 15 concerts in cities across North America.

After a three-year search, the HSO announced the appointment of its new music director, Edward Cumming, who told Connecticut to “Expect the Unexpected.” This new appointment invigorated the orchestra, and fresh programming brought in huge crowds. With this change also came a change of attitude: Cumming wanted the HSO to be an orchestra for the people of Greater Hartford, and the programming should reflect this. With this in mind, the symphony embarked on a mission to connect with the immediate community of Hartford, starting with a Martin Luther King Jr. Tribute concert and a new Latino Music Festival.

The League of American Orchestras awarded the Hartford Symphony Orchestra the 2003 ASCAP award for Adventurous Programming of Contemporary Music. The Hispanic Professional Network recognized the HSO's "dedication to promote awareness of Hispanic arts and culture". In addition, the HSO joined a distinguished roster of orchestras to receive two special honors: major funding from MetLife Foundation's "Music for Life" program and an invitation to join the "Sustaining the American Orchestra" initiative organized by The Kennedy Center and funded by SBC.

The HSO was one of three orchestras in North America to be honored with the 2004 MetLife Award for Excellence in Community Engagement. The symphony went on tour once again with Andrea Bocelli, and was awarded the Governor's Arts Award "in recognition of remarkable artistic achievement and contributions to the arts in the state of Connecticut."

In 2005, the HSO toured with Andrea Bocelli for a third time, continuing to bring the orchestra national acclaim. For its innovative programming at home in CT, the Connecticut Natural Gas presented the orchestra with its Diversity Award.

World-renowned cellist Yo-Yo Ma joined Edward Cumming and the HSO for the opening concert of the 2007–08 season. After a landmark year of diverse programming, the League of American Orchestras awarded the HSO its ASCAP award for Adventurous Programming of Contemporary Music for the second time in four years.

The HSO’s 65th-anniversary season was marked by performances of all of Beethoven's symphonies, performed in The Bushnell's intimate Belding Theater. This year also marked the HSO’s most successful Talcott Mountain Music Festival of all time.

In 2009, Cumming announced that his final season as music director would be in 2010–11; thus began a two-year music director search to find his replacement.

=== 2010s ===
From 2009 to 2011 the HSO led a very public music director search which brought six music directors from around the county to Hartford to each guest conduct the orchestra. The final candidate made the biggest impression and was hired immediately following her appearance with the HSO. In January 2011, the HSO announced that Carolyn Kuan, formerly of the Seattle Symphony Orchestra, would be the next music director, starting from the 2012 season. She was the youngest individual and first woman to be awarded this title.

The 2011–12 season opened with a free concert called "Picnic in the Park" which featured performers and repertoire that would be featured on Kuan's inaugural season. From there, the HSO launched a series of new community initiatives, including CityMusic, an El Sistema inspired after school music program in Hartford.

In 2012, the HSO received a Getty grant to launch the Musicians Care Project, which seeks to enhance the quality of life for people of all ages whose healthcare needs prevent them from taking part in traditional music performances by providing live, interactive musical experiences.

Through a combination of accessible and innovative, community-based programming, the HSO's concert attendance reached a ten-year high point, bringing in new and younger audience members.

In 2014, the HSO entered into a management services alliance with The Bushnell Center for the Performing Arts. Under the agreement, the HSO and The Bushnell remain independent, 501(c) (3) non-profit organizations while The Bushnell provides executive and administrative support to the HSO.

== Music directors ==
- 2012–present Carolyn Kuan
- 2001–2011 Edward Cumming
- 1985–2000 Michael Lankester
- 1965–1984 Arthur Winograd
- 1953–1965 Fritz Mahler
- 1947–1953 George Heck
- 1947–1953 Moshe Paranov
- 1938–1941 Léon Barzin
- 1936–1938 Jacques Gordon
- 1934–1936 Angelo Coniglione
