= Elsie Ivancich Dunin =

American dance ethnologist and choreographer

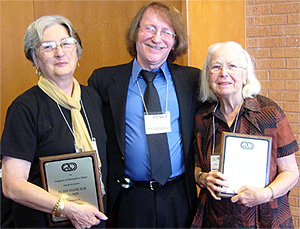
Elsie Ivancich Dunin (left) and Allegra Fuller Snyder (right) after receiving the 2006 CORD Award for Outstanding Leadership in Dance Research from CORD president Ray Miller (center)

Elsie Ivancich Dunin (born July 19, 1935) is a dance ethnologist (ethnochoreologist), choreographer, professor and author specializing in folk dance from Croatia, Macedonia, and Romani (Gypsies) in Macedonia. Her studies focus on Croatian diaspora communities and associated sword dances in both Old and New World contexts. She is Professor Emerita of dance ethnology from the University of California at Los Angeles (UCLA) and is currently a dance research advisor with the Institute of Ethnology and Folklore Research in Zagreb, Croatia. Her two daughters are Teresa (T.J.) and Elonka Dunin.

== Cross-Cultural Dance Resources Collection ==
Dunin is also a leading member of Cross-Cultural Dance Resources, (CCDR) a non-profit organization dedicated to the study of dance ethnology. Founded in 1981, the CCDR has amassed a collection of over 15,000 books, manuscripts, personal papers, costumes, films and instruments. In April 2008, Dunin, who serves on the organization's board, made a gift to Herberger College of the Arts to provide for the collection's permanent care and curation.

== Awards ==
- In 2006, Dunin was awarded the "Outstanding Leadership in Dance Research" award by Congress on Research in Dance (CORD)

== Books ==
- Folk dances, 1969, ASIN B0007FZ1DO
- Gypsy wedding, dance and customs, 1971, ASIN: B0007C5K9C
- Yugoslav dance: An introduction and list of sources available in United States libraries, 1981, ISBN 0-918660-11-4
- Dance Occasions and Festive Dress in Yugoslavia, 1984, ISBN 99946-1-174-7
- Starobosansko kolo in Yugoslavia and in California, 1988, ISBN 0-918660-77-7
- DdA reference format for dance, 1989, ASIN: B0006F2EJ4
- Orata vo Makedonija: Scenski del : Tanec, 1995, ISBN 9989-9774-0-2
- (editor) Dance And Society: Dancer as a Cultural Performer (European Folklore Institute Bibliotheca Traditionis Europae), 2005, ISBN 963-05-8273-2
