= Ruth St. Denis =

American modern dancer (1879–1968)

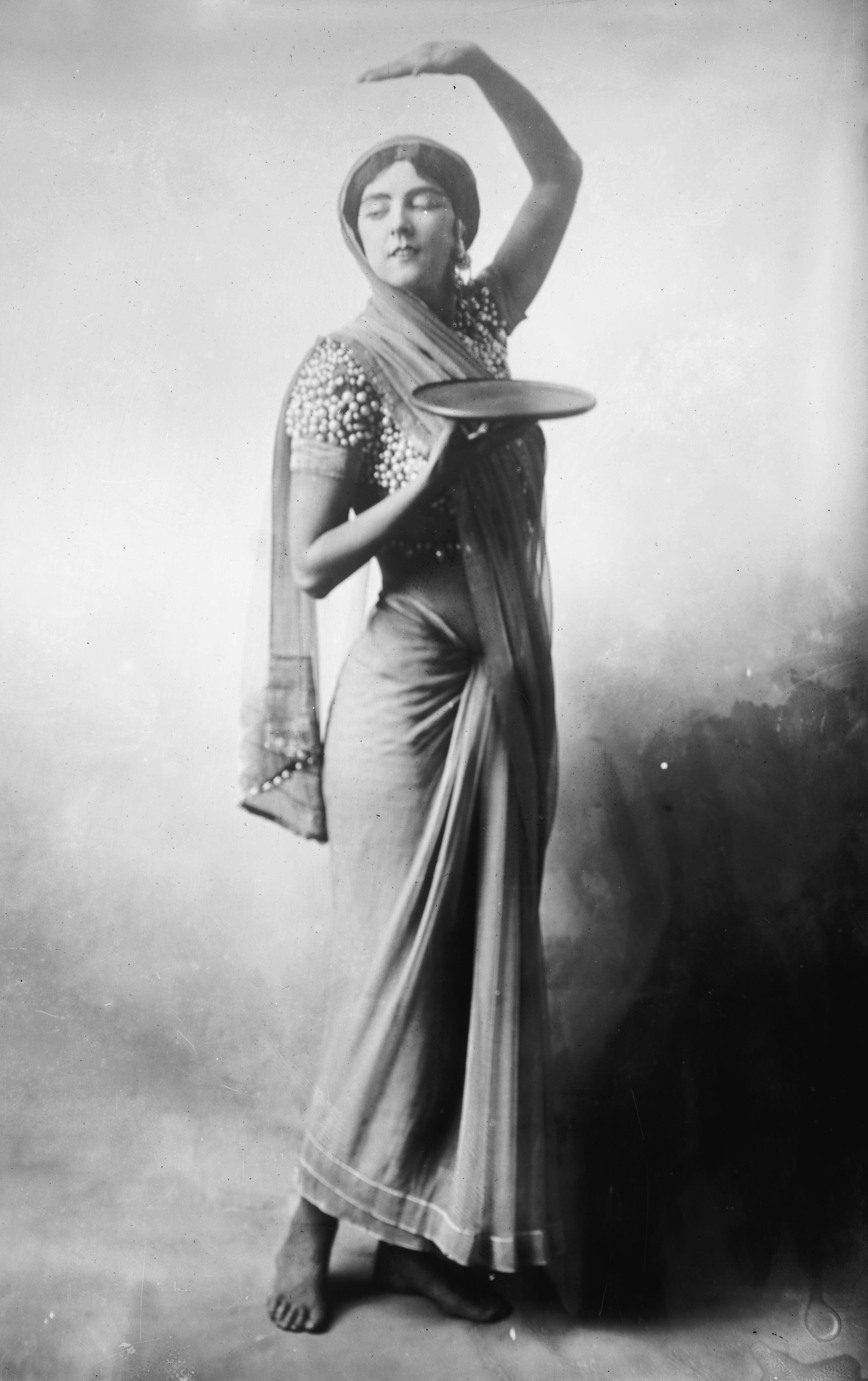
- Born: Ruth Dennis; January 20, 1879; Newark, New Jersey, U.S.
- Died: July 21, 1968 (aged 89); Los Angeles, California, U.S.
- Known for: Modern dance
- Spouse: Ted Shawn (m. 1914)

Ruth St. Denis (born Ruth Dennis; January 20, 1879 – July 21, 1968) was an American pioneer of modern dance, introducing eastern ideas into the art and paving the way for other women in dance. She was inspired by the Delsarte advocate Genevieve Stebbins. St. Denis was the co-founder in 1915 of the American Denishawn School of Dancing and Related Arts. She taught notable performers including Martha Graham and Doris Humphrey. In 1938, she founded the pioneering dance program at Adelphi University. She published several articles on spiritual dance and the mysticism of the body.

Her signature solos continue to be performed. She was inducted into the National Museum of Dance and Hall of Fame in 1987.

== Biography ==
=== Early life ===
Ruth Dennis was born in Newark, New Jersey on January 20, 1879. Her parents were Ruth Emma Hull (a physician by training), and Thomas Laban Dennis, a machinist and inventor; they were not married. She was raised on the small Pin Oaks Farm in New Jersey, where she studied Christian Science. She used to invent melodramas, specialising in fainting and collapsing to the floor in front of an audience of friends. As a child, she learned exercises based on François Delsarte's Society Gymnastics and Voice Culture. This was the beginning of St. Denis's dance training, and was instrumental in developing her technique later in life. In 1891 she raised the money to travel briefly to New York, auditioning in the Marwig studio; she was pronounced to have talent, and her mother set about getting her into theatre. In 1892, she witnessed the Delsarte advocate Genevieve Stebbins performing a matinee, The Dance of Day; she described the experience as "the real birth of my art life".

=== Debut ===
In 1894, after years of practicing Delsarte poses, she debuted as a skirt dancer for Worth's Family Theatre and Museum. From this modest start, she progressed to touring with an acclaimed producer and director, David Belasco; this gave her the opportunity to observe Belasco's skill in creating a theatrical atmosphere with a "perfect combination of subliminal suggestion and concrete detail". While touring in Belasco's production of Madame DuBarry in 1904 she had a career-changing moment. She was at a drugstore with another member of Belasco's company in Buffalo, New York, when she saw a poster advertising Egyptian Deities brand cigarettes. The poster portrayed the Egyptian goddess Isis enthroned in a temple; this image captivated her on the spot and inspired her to create dances that expressed the mysticism that the goddess's image conveyed. From then on, she was immersed in Oriental philosophies.

In 1905, she began her career as a solo artist, soon making her first European tour using the stage name of St. Denis. The first piece that resulted from her interest in the Orient was Radha performed in 1906. Drawing from Hindu mythology, Radha is the story of Krishna and his love for a mortal milkmaid. Radha was originally performed to music from Léo Delibes' opera Lakmé. This piece was a celebration of the five senses and appealed to a contemporary fascination with the Orient. In 1909, St. Denis performed a Salome dance at Broadway's Hudson Theatre. This was during the height of the "Salomania" craze in the U.S., and one reviewer declared she was “out-Salomeing all the Salomes" and that "Miss St. Denis burst upon dazzled audiences.” Although her choreography was not culturally accurate or authentic, it was expressive of the themes that St. Denis perceived in Oriental culture and highly entertaining to contemporary audiences. St. Denis believed dance to be a spiritual expression, and her choreography reflected this idea.

=== Denishawn ===
In 1911, a young dancer named Ted Shawn was impressed by seeing St. Denis perform in Denver. In 1914, Shawn applied to be her student, and soon became her artistic partner and husband. Together they founded Denishawn, the "cradle of American modern dance." One of her more famous pupils was Martha Graham. Together St. Denis and Shawn founded the Los Angeles Denishawn school in 1915. Students studied ballet movements without shoes, ethnic and folk dances, Dalcroze Eurhythmics, and Delsarte gymnastics. In 1916 they created a collection of dances inspired by Egypt, which included Tillers of the Soil, a duet between St. Denis and Shawn, as well as Pyrrhic Dance, an all-male dance piece. Her exploration of the Orient continued into 1923 when she staged Ishtar of the Seven Gates in which she portrayed a Babylonian goddess. Together St. Denis and Shawn toured throughout the 1910s and 1920s, often performing their works on the vaudeville stage.

Other notable dancers such as Doris Humphrey, Lillian Powell, Evan-Burrows Fontaine and Charles Weidman studied at Denishawn. Graham, Humphrey, Weidman and the future silent film star Louise Brooks all performed as dancers with the Denishawn company. At Denishawn, St. Denis served as inspiration to her young students, while Shawn taught the technique classes. St. Denis and Shawn were instrumental in creating the legendary dance festival Jacob's Pillow.

=== Later career ===
Although Denishawn had crumbled by 1930, St. Denis continued to dance, teach and choreograph independently as well as in collaboration with other artists. St. Denis redirected her works from Orient-inspired to combining religion and dance through her Rhythmic Choir of Dancers. Kelly Mayo comments that through these works, St. Denis sought to embody the Virgin Mary in the same manner in which she once sought to embody goddesses. In 1938 St. Denis founded Adelphi University's dance program, one of the first dance departments in an American university. It has since become a cornerstone of Adelphi's Department of Performing Arts. She cofounded a second school in 1940, the School of Nataya, which focused on teaching Oriental dance. For many years, St. Denis taught dance at her studio, at 3433 Cahuenga Boulevard West, near Universal City, California.

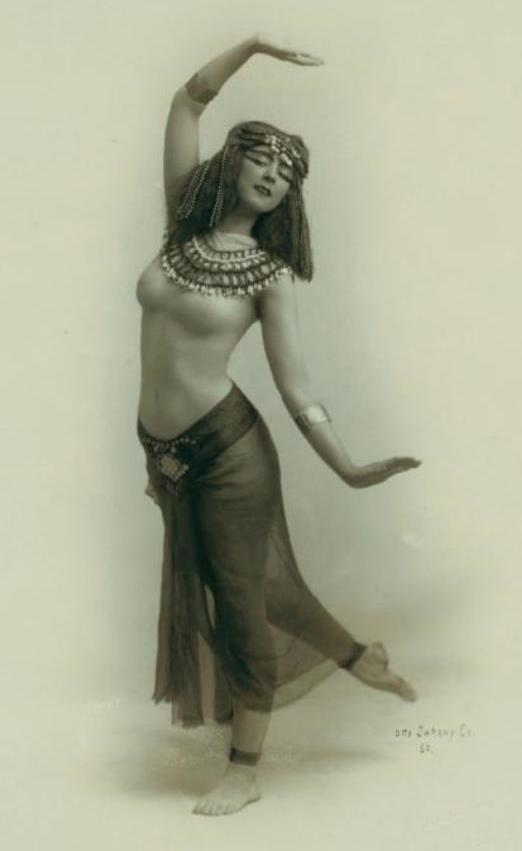
Photographed by Otto Sarony, c. 1900. St. Denis began to investigate Oriental dance after seeing an image of the Egyptian goddess Isis in a cigarette advertisement.

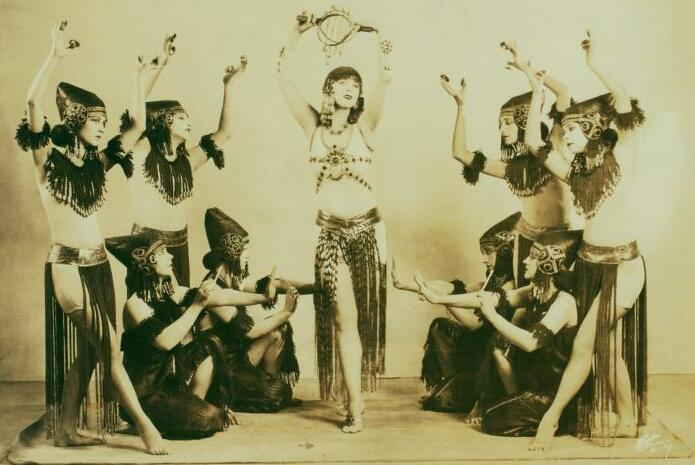
St Denis and Company in Ishtar of the Seven Gates. Photo by White Studio, 1920s. The dancers are Doris Humphrey, Louise Brooks, Jeordie Graham, Pauline Lawrence, Anne Douglas, Lenore Scheffer, Lenore Hardy, and Lenore Sadowska.

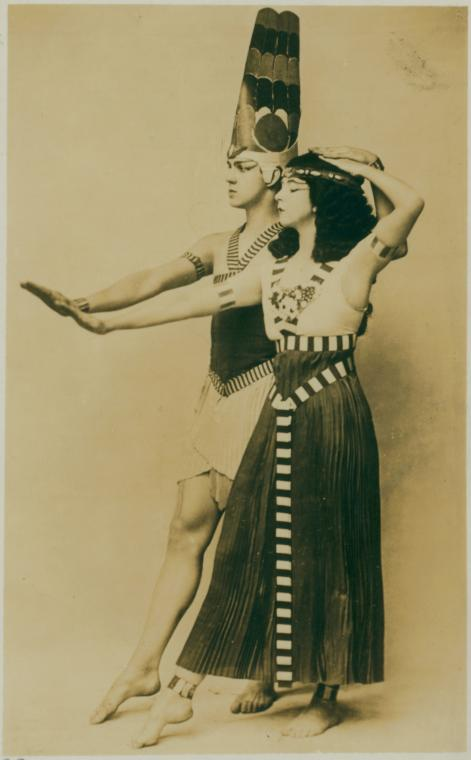
Ted Shawn and St. Denis in Egyptian Ballet. They married, created and performed many productions together, and co-founded the Denishawn School of Dancing and Related Arts.

== Death and legacy ==
St. Denis died in Los Angeles on July 21, 1968, aged 89. Her signature solos continue to be performed as in "The Art of the Solo" at the Baltimore Museum of Art in 2006, which began with St. Denis's "The Incense". George Jackson described this as "waft[ing] into space as the image of a woman in motion amidst ascending spirals of smoke", conveying "serenity, 'spirituality' if you will, ... [not] at odds with sensuality."

St. Denis was inducted into the National Museum of Dance's Mr. & Mrs. Cornelius Vanderbilt Whitney Hall of Fame in 1987, its first year.

The global organization Dances of Universal Peace were started by a student of St. Denis, Samuel L. Lewis. The Dances of Universal Peace organization subsequently published many of St. Denis's writings on spiritual dance and the mysticism of the body.

== Works ==
=== Books ===
- Lotus Light. Poems. Boston/New York, 1932.
- An Unfinished Life: an Autobiography. Dance Horizons Republication, Brooklyn, New York, 1969.

=== Articles ===
- "Ballet of the States". Dance Chronicle. Studies in Dance and the Related Arts. Volume 20, Issue 1/1997, pp. 52–60.
- "Dance as spiritual expression". Rogers, Frederick Rand (ed.): Dance: A Basic Educational Technique. A Functional Approach to the Use of Rhythmics and Dance as Prime Methods of Body Development and Control, and Transformation of Moral and Social Behaviour. Dance Horizons, New York 1980, pp. 100–111, ISBN 978-0-8712-7108-2.
- "The Dance as Life Experience". Brown, Jean Morrison (ed.): The Vision of Modern Dance. Princeton Book Company, Princeton/New Jersey 1979, pp. 21–25, ISBN 978-0-9166-2213-8.
- "Religious Manifestations in the Dance". Sorell, Walter (ed.): The Dance has many Faces. Columbia University Press, New York/London 1968, pp. 12–18, ISBN 978-0-2310-2968-1.
- "Freedom. A Rhythmic Interpretation". Dance Observer. Volume 23, Issue 1/1956, pp. 6–7.
- "What is Religious Dance?" Dance Observer. Volume 17, Issue 5/1950, pp. 68–69.
- "Seeds of a New Order". Division of Higher Education of the Board of Education of the United Methodist Church (ed.): Motive. Volume 8, Issue 7/1948, pp. 28–29.
- "My Vision". Dance Observer. Volume 7, Issue 3/1940, pp. 33, 42.
- "The Dance of the East". Theatre Arts Monthly. The International Magazine of Theatre and Screen. August 1927, pp. 605–612.

== See also ==
- List of dancers
- Sada Yacco
- Isadora Duncan
- Edna Guy

== Sources ==
- Shelton, Suzanne (1981). Divine Dancer: A Biography of Ruth St. Denis. New York: Doubleday. ISBN 978-0-292-77046-1.
