= José Limón =

Mexican dancer and choreographer (1908–1972)

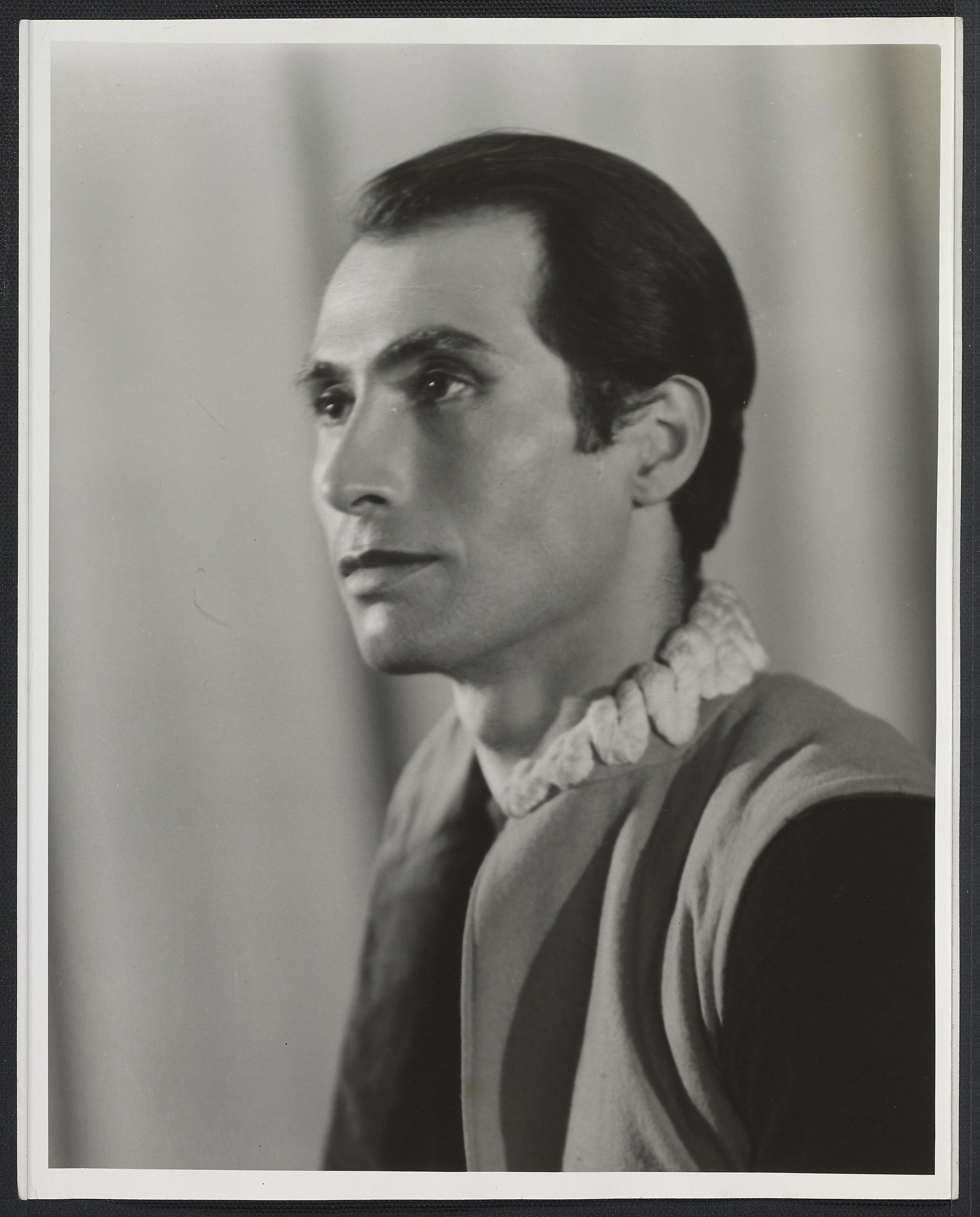
- Limón in 1936
- Born: José Arcadio Limón; January 12, 1908; Culiacán, Mexico
- Died: December 2, 1972 (aged 64)
- Occupation(s): Modern dancer, choreographer
- Years active: 1929–1969
- Spouse: Pauline Lawrence (m. 1941)
- Career
- Former groups: José Limón Dance Company (now the Limón Dance Company)
- Dances: The Moor's Pavane (1949)

José Arcadio Limón (January 12, 1908 – December 2, 1972) was a dancer and choreographer from Mexico and who developed what is now known as 'Limón technique'. In the 1940s, he founded the José Limón Dance Company (now the Limón Dance Company), and in 1968 he created the José Limón Foundation to carry on his work.

In his choreography, Limón spoke to the complexities of human life as experienced through the body. His dances feature large, visceral gestures — reaching, bending, pulling, grasping — to communicate emotion. Inspired in part by his teacher Doris Humphrey's and Charles Weidman's theories about the importance of body weight and dynamics, his own Limón technique emphasizes the rhythms of falling and recovering balance and the importance of good breathing to maintaining flow in a dance. He also utilized the dance vocabulary developed by both Doris Humphrey and Charles Weidman, which aimed at demonstrating emotion through dance in a way that was much less strict and stylized than ballet as well as used movements of the body that felt most natural and went along with gravity.

Limón's most well-known work is The Moor's Pavane (1949), based on Shakespeare's Othello, which won a major award. Other works were inspired by subjects as diverse as the McCarthy hearings (The Traitor) and the life of La Malinche, who served as interpreter for Hernán Cortés. Limón generally sets his dances to music, choosing composers ranging from Ludwig van Beethoven and Frederic Chopin to Arnold Schoenberg and Heitor Villa-Lobos.

== Education ==
José Arcadio Limón was born January 12, 1908, in Culiacán, Mexico, the eldest of twelve children. In 1915, his family moved to Los Angeles, California.

After graduating from Lincoln High School (Lincoln Heights, Los Angeles), Limón attended UCLA as an art major. In 1928 he moved and studied at the New York School of Design. In 1929, he was inspired to dance after attending one of Harald Kreutzberg and Yvonne Georgi's performances and enrolled in the Humphrey-Weidman school.

== Early career ==
In 1930, Limón first performed on Broadway, and later that same year he choreographed his first dance, "Etude in D Minor", a duet with Letitia Ide. Limón recruited Ide and schoolmates Eleanor King and Ernestine Stodelle to form "The Little Group". From 1932 to 1933, Limón made two more Broadway appearances, in the musical revue Americana and in Irving Berlin's As Thousands Cheer, choreographed by Charles Weidman. Limón also tried his hand at choreography at Broadway's New Amsterdam Theatre. Limón made several more appearances throughout the next few years in shows such as Humphrey's New Dance, Theatre Piece, With my Red Fires, and Weidman's Quest.

In 1937, Limón was chosen to be a Bennington Fellow. At the Bennington Festival at Mills College in 1939, Limón first own work was exhibited, titled Danzas Mexicanas. After five years, however, Limón would return to Broadway to star as a featured dancer in Keep Off the Grass under the choreographer George Balanchine.

In 1941, Limón left the Humphrey-Weidman company to work with May O'Donnell. They co-choreographed several pieces together, such as War Lyrics and Curtain Riser. On October 3, 1941, Limón married Pauline Lawrence, a founding member and the manager of the Humphrey-Weidman company. The partnership with O'Donnell dissolved the following year, and Limón created work for a program at Humphrey-Weidman.

In 1943, Limón's made his final appearance on Broadway in Balanchine's Rosalinda, a piece he performed with Mary Ellen Moylan. He spent the rest of that year creating dances on American and folk themes at the Studio Theatre before being drafted into the U.S. Army in April 1943. During this time, he collaborated with composers Frank Loesser and Alex North, choreographing several works for the Army Special Services division. The most well known among these is Concerto Grosso.

== José Limón Dance Company ==
Attaining American citizenship in 1946, Limón formed the Limón Dance Company. When Limón began his company, he asked Humphrey to be the artistic director, making it the first modern dance company to have an artistic director who was not also the founder. The company had its formal debut at Bennington College, playing such pieces as Doris Humphrey's Lament and The Story of Mankind. Among the first company members were Pauline Koner, Lucas Hoving, Betty Jones, Ruth Currier, and Limón himself. Dancer and choreographer Louis Falco also danced with the José Limón Dance Company from 1960 to 1970, and Falco starred opposite to Rudolph Nureyev in Limon's Moor's Pavane on Broadway from 1974 to 1975.

While working with Humphrey, Limón developed his repertory and established the principles of the style that he was to become the Limón technique. By 1947, the company had reached New York, debuting at the Belasco Theatre with Humphrey's Day on Earth. In 1948, the company first appeared at the Connecticut College American Dance Festival and would return each summer for many years. Limón choreographed The Moor's Pavane in 1949, and it received the Dance Magazine Award for the year's most outstanding choreography. In the spring of 1950, Limón and his group appeared in Paris with Ruth Page, becoming the first American modern dance company to appear in Europe.

In 1951, Limón joined the faculty of The Juilliard School, where a new dance division had been developed. He also accepted an invitation to Mexico City's Instituto Nacional de Bellas Artes, where he created six works. Between 1953 and 1956, he choreographed a number of shows and created roles in Humphrey's Ruins and Visions and Ritmo Jondo. In 1954, the Limón Company was one of the first to take advantage of the U.S. State Department's International Exchange Program with a company tour to South America. The company later embarked on a five-month tour of Europe and the Near East and, again, to South America and Central America. It was during this time that Limón received his second Dance Magazine Award (1957).

In 1956, Limón choreographed The Emperor Jones, which was loosely based on Eugene O'Neill's play of the same title (see The Emperor Jones) and was set to music by Heitor Villa-Lobos. Following the premier of the work and subsequent restagings by Limón, there was some controversy surrounding the use of blackface for the role of Brutus Jones (the African American prisoner who eventually takes the title of the tyrant Emperor Jones). In 1958, following a US State Department funded tour of The Emperor Jones in Poland, Limón was asked by a Polish official if he had been permitted to perform The Emperor Jones in blackface in the United States. He responded to this query by writing that "Emperor Jones was first of all a work of art, and I hoped a good one, and that even if it were in defiance of prevalent political and social usages, no one would or could prohibit its performance." In this instance, the US government used Limón's work and its use of blackface as a response to international critics of its race relations by using art as a form of free speech free from sociopolitical constraints and one in which Limón was overtly complicit.

In 1958, Doris Humphrey, who had been the artistic director for the Limón Company, died and Limón took over her position. Between 1958 and 1960, Limón choreographed with Pauline Koner.

In 1962, the company returned to Central Park as the opening performance to New York's Shakespeare Festival. The next year, under sponsorship of the U.S. State Department, he toured the Far East for twelve weeks, choreographing The Deamon to a score by Paul Hindemith, who conducted the première.

In 1964, he went on to receive the Capezio Award and was appointed the artistic director of the American Dance Theatre at Lincoln Center. The following year, Limón appeared in an National Education Telecast|NET special titled The Dance Theater of José Limón.

In 1967, after performing with the company at Washington Cathedral, Limón received a grant from the National Endowment for the Arts. He and his company were also invited to perform at the White House for President Lyndon B. Johnson and King Hassan II of Morocco.

Limón's final appearances onstage as a dancer were in 1969, when he performed in The Traitor and The Moor's Pavane at the Brooklyn Academy of Music.

In 1970, Limón was diagnosed with prostate cancer. In the last years of his life, despite this illness, he choreographed and filmed a solo dance interpretation for CBS. In 1971, he founded the little-known Jose Limón Philadelphia Dance Theater, originally intended to become a second company. In December 1972, at the age of 64, he died of cancer.

== José Limón Foundation and Limón technique ==
In 1968, Limón incorporated the José Limón Foundation to continue his legacy as a choreographer, and in 2008 it received the National Medal for the Arts. In 1985, the Limón Institute was formed as an arm of the foundation that oversees licensing of his dances and teaching of what is now known as "Limón technique". According to the Limón Institute, the technique "emphasizes the natural rhythms of fall and recovery and the interplay between weight and weightlessness to provide dancers with an organic approach to movement that easily adapts to a range of choreographic styles."

José Limón considered Isadora Duncan, Harald Kreutzberg, Doris Humphrey, and Charles Weidman as important influences on his style of dance. It was after seeing Humphrey perform in Inquest (1945) that Limón decided to focus his choreography on showing the beauty and tragedy of human life rather than on entertaining people. His technique was informed by Humphrey's ideas about the dynamics of body weight as the body rose, fell, and remained in suspension during a dance. He encouraged students to see their bodies as complex instruments — using the simile of an orchestra — and to strive for clarity and expressiveness of movement without tension. He paid particular attention to proper breathing because it enabled continuously flowing motion.

Limón technique was disseminated during his life and after his death by teachers such as Aaron Osborne, a former member of the Limón company who taught his technique in the 1980s. Dance companies such as the Doug Varone and Dancers company continue to teach Limón's style of dancing. Limón's own company is still active under the shortened name Limon Dance Company, with the express purpose of maintaining the Limón technique and repertory.

== Honors and legacy ==
Limón received a number honorary doctorates in his lifetime, including from Wesleyan University, the University of North Carolina, Oberlin College, and Colby College.

In 1973, the José Limón Collection was given to the New York Public Library Dance Collection by Charles Tomlinson.

In 1988, the José Limón National Dance Award was created in his honor to recognize outstanding figures of contemporary and modern dance.

The New York Public Library for the Performing Arts presented a retrospective exhibition on his life and work in 1996, and in 1997 he was inducted into the National Museum of Dance and Hall of Fame.

In 2003, Limón was named one of America's "irreplaceable Dance Treasures" by the Dance Heritage Coalition. In 2012, he was chosen to appear on a U.S. postage stamp in honour of his contribution to the art of dance.

Several books about Limón and his technique have been published, including The Illustrated Dance Technique of José Limón (1984). His autobiographical writings appeared in edited form in 1999 under the title An Unfinished Memoir.

After his death, many of his works were reconstructed and interpreted for performances around the world by Sarah Stackhouse, his principal dancer 1958-1969, and his teaching assistant at Juilliard School until his death.

== Choreography ==
Year	Title	Notes
1930	Etude in D Minor	
1930	Bacchanale	
1930	Two Preludes	
1931	Petite Suite	
1931	B Minor Suite	
1931	Mazurca	
1932	Bach Suite	
1933	Canción y Danza	
1933	Danza (Prokofiev)	
1933	Pièces Froides	(Cold Pieces)
1933	Roberta	
1935	Three Studies	
1935	Nostalgic Fragments	
1935	Prelude	
1936	Satiric Lament	
1936	Hymn	
1937	Danza de la Muerte	(Dance of Death)
1937	Opus for Three and Props	
1939	Danzas Mexicanas	(Mexican Dances)
1940	War Lyrics	
1941	Curtain Raiser	
1941	This Story Is Legend	
1941	Three Inventories on Casey Jones	
1941	Three Women	
1941	Praeludium: Theme and Variations	
1942	Chaconne	solo created for Limón himself, set to music by Johann Sebastian Bach; has since been performed by Mikhail Baryshnikov
1942	Alley Tune	
1942	Mazurca	
1943	Western Folk Suite	
1943	Fun for the Birds	
1944	Deliver the Gods	
1944	Hi, Yank	
1944	Interlude Dances	
1944	Mexilinda	
1944	Rosenkavalier Waltz	
1945	Concerto Grosso	trio, set to music by Antonio Vivaldi
1945	Eden Tree	
1945	Danza (Arcadio)	
1946	Masquerade	
1947	La Malinche	trio based on the life of La Malinche, set to music by Norman Lloyd
1947	The Song of Songs	
1947	Sonata Opus 4	
1949	The Moor's Pavane	quartet based on Shakespeare's Othello, set to music by Henry Purcell; won Limón a Dance Magazine Award
1950	The Exiles	duet inspired by John Milton's poem Paradise Lost; set to music by Arnold Schoenberg
1950	Concert	
1951	Los Cuatros Soles	
1951	Dialogues	
1951	Antigona	
1951	Tonantizintla	
1951	The Queen's Epicedium	
1951	Redes	
1952	The Visitation	
1952	El Grito	revised version of Redes
1953	Don Juan Fantasia	
1954	Ode to the Dance	
1954	The Traitor	ensemble work inspired by the McCarthy hearings, set to music by Gunther Schuller
1955	Scherzo (Barracuda, Lincoln, Venable)	
1955	Scherzo (Johnson)	quartet, set to music by Hazel Johnson
1955	Symphony for Strings	ensemble work, set to music by William Schuman
1956	There Is a Time	ensemble work inspired by the book of Ecclesiastes in the Bible, set to music by Norman Dello Joio
1956	A King's Heart	
1956	The Emperor Jones	ensemble work inspired by Eugene O'Neill's play of the same title; set to music by Heitor Villa-Lobos
1956	Rhythmic Study	
1957	Blue Roses	
1958	Missa Brevis	ensemble work in memory of lives and cities destroyed during World War II; set to music by Zoltán Kodály
1958	Serenata	
1958	Dances	
1958	Mazurkas	ensemble work set to music by Frederic Chopin
1959	Tenebrae 1914	
1959	The Apostate	
1960	Barren Sceptre	
1961	Performance	
1961	The Moirai	
1961	Sonata for Two Cellos	
1962	I, Odysseus	
1963	The Demon	
1963	Concerto in D Minor After Vivaldi	
1964	Two Essays for Large Ensemble	
1964	A Choreographic Offering	an homage to Doris Humphrey, with music by Johann Sebastian Bach
1965	Variations on a Theme of Paganini	
1965	My Son, My Enemy	
1966	The Winged	ensemble work with music originally by Hank Johnson; restaged by Carla Maxwell in 1996 with new music composed for the dance by Jon Magnussen
1967	Mac Aber's Dance	
1967	Psalm	ensemble work with music originally by Eugene Lester; restaged by Carla Maxwell in 2002 set to new music composed for the dance by Jon Magnussen
1968	Comedy	
1968	Legend	
1969	La Piñata	
1971	Revel	
1971	The Unsung	ensemble work inspired by Native American chiefs; shown in 1970 as a work in progress
1971	Dances for Isadora	set of solos in homage to Isadora Duncan, set to music by Frederic Chopin
1971	And David Wept	
1972	Carlota	
1972	Orfeo	quintet based on the myth of Orpheus and Eurydice, set to music by Ludwig van Beethoven
1971	The Winds	for Philadelphia Dance Theater
1986	Luther	
?	The Waldstein Sonata	ensemble work completed after Limón's death by Daniel Lewis; with music by Ludwig van Beethoven

== See also ==
- List of dancers
