= Fritz Mahler =

Austrian conductor (1901–1973)

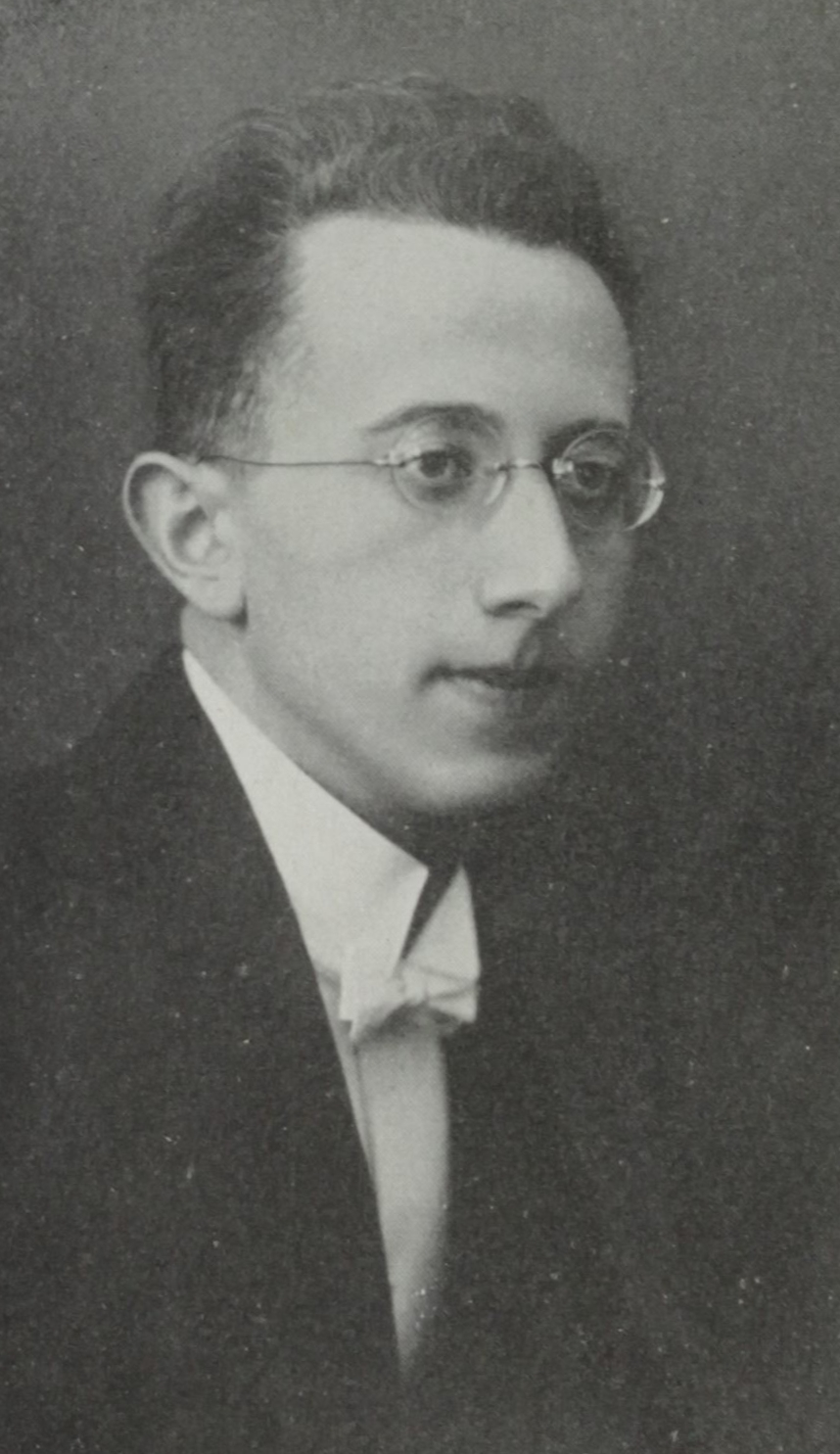
Fritz Mahler in 1925

Fritz Mahler (July 16, 1901 – June 18, 1973) was an Austrian-born conductor.

Born in Vienna, Mahler became a leading conductor in Europe with such ensembles as the Berlin Radio Symphony Orchestra, the Dresden Philharmonic and the Danish State Symphony. He fled Europe in 1936 for the United States. He was married, from 1939 until his death, to dancer Pauline Koner and taught at summer sessions of the Juilliard School in New York for many years (advanced conducting, director of the opera department). In 1939, he conducted the Naumburg Orchestral Concerts, in the Naumburg Bandshell, Central Park, in the summer series. From 1940/41, he was the city's director of music for the National Youth Administration as well. Mahler was music director of the Erie Philharmonic from 1947 to 1953 and the Hartford Symphony Orchestra from 1953 to 1962. Koner's memoir Solitary Song (Duke University Press, 1989) provides much information about his career. Mahler died in Winston-Salem, North Carolina, aged 71.

Fritz Mahler's father was a cousin of the composer Gustav Mahler.

Preceded by Moshe Paranov	Music Directors, Hartford Symphony; 1953–1962	Succeeded by Arthur Winograd
