= Joann Kealiinohomoku =

American anthropologist

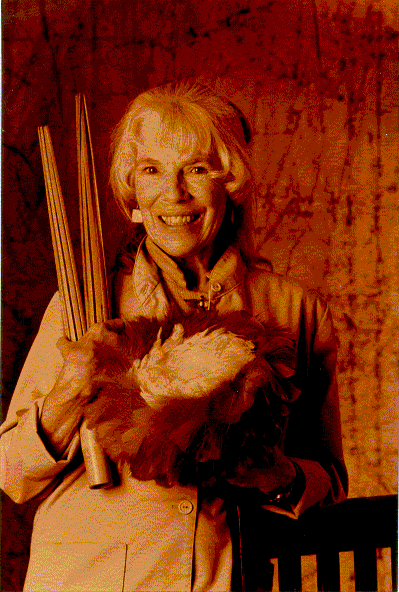
- Joann W. Kealiinohomoku, 1997; Photo by John Running
- Born: Joann Marie Wheeler; May 20, 1930; Kansas City, Missouri
- Died: December 2, 2015 (aged 85); Flagstaff, Arizona
- Other name: Joann Keali'inohomoku
- Occupation: Anthropologist
- Website: http://www.ccdr.org

Joann Wheeler Kealiinohomoku (also known by other orthographic variation including Keali'inohomoku) (1930–2015) was an American anthropologist and educator, co-founder of the dance research organization Cross-Cultural Dance Resources (CCDR). She has written and/or edited numerous books and articles, including contributions on dance-related subjects to multiple encyclopedias, such as writing the entry for "Music and dance in the United States" in the Garland Encyclopedia of World Music. Some of her best-known works are "An anthropologist looks at ballet as a form of ethnic dance" (1970) and "Theory and methods for an anthropological study of dance" (1976). An associate professor of anthropology at Northern Arizona University, she was named professor emerita in 1987. In 1997, she received the first annual award for "Outstanding Contribution to Dance Research" from Congress on Research in Dance. In 2000, the CCDR collection was named by President Bill Clinton's White House Millennium Council, as something that needed to be preserved under the "Save America's Treasures" program.

== Biography ==
She was born Joann Marie Wheeler on May 20, 1930 in Kansas City, Missouri, to George V. and Leona Lavena (Moore) Wheeler. Wheeler attended grammar school in Des Plaines, Illinois and Whitefish Bay High School in the village of Whitefish Bay, Wisconsin. She later studied at Northwestern University, receiving a Bachelor of Specialized Studies degree in 1955, an MA in 1965, and a PhD from Indiana University in 1976, with her dissertation being "Theory and methods for an anthropological study of dance."

In 1953, she married Thomas Samuel Kealiinohomoku, and they had one child, Halla, before divorcing in 1963. She was the dance reviewer for the Honolulu Star-Bulletin from 1960 to 1963. In 1969, she published one of her best-known works, "An anthropologist looks at ballet as a form of ethnic dance".

Kealiinohomoku served on the Board of Directors of Native Americans for Community Action in Flagstaff, Arizona from 1977 to 1982. She was also a member of the Society of Ethnomusicology, where she was co-founder of their Southwestern Chapter. From 1974–1977 she was on the board of directors of the Congress on Research in Dance, and in 1981 was co-founder of Cross-Cultural Dance Resources, a dance research organization in Flagstaff, Arizona, where she was a permanent member of the board of directors. In 2008, it was announced that the CCDR collection was to be transferred to the Herberger College of the Arts at Arizona State University Dance Department in Tempe, Arizona for permanent curation.

In 1992, Kealiinohomoku was the series advisor for Dancing, an eight-part public television series on Thirteen/WNET, which first aired in 1993.

== Awards ==
- 1996, "Outstanding Contribution to Dance Research", Congress on Research in Dance
- 1996, Distinguished Public Scholar award, Arizona Humanities Council
- 2000, CCDR collection recognized by President Clinton's White House Millennium Council's "Save America's Treasures" project

== Selected works ==
- "An anthropologist looks at ballet as a form of ethnic dance" (1970)
  - “An anthropologist looks at ballet as a form of ethnic dance” is one of Joann Kealiinohomoku’s most well-known works in the field of dance-anthropology. Her principal goals are to challenge the field of western dance history in its inconsistent definitions of what dance is, and its racist and ethnocentric accounts of non-Western dance practices; she does this by arguing that ballet is a form of ethnic dance, a claim which both shocks the dominant narrative and redefines the term “ethnic”. The piece is subdivided into sections, “Paradigm”, “Definitions” and “Ethnicity of Ballet”. Kealiinohomoku begins by addressing historically inconsistent and ethnocentric definitions of dance, used by western dance history scholars and choreographers to describe non-Western dance traditions. She engages with the work of Walter Sorell, Lincoln Kirstein, Walter Terry, Claire Holt, Agnes DeMille and John Martin. For Kealiinohomoku, much of the previous work in the field of dance history illuminates a “pervasive ethnocentric bias” (534).
    - Paradigm: Some of the inaccuracies that she addresses are the misconception of non-Western dance traditions as formless, frenzied, hyper-sexual, and the assumption that the dances formed spontaneously through community activity, but without dance leaders. She uses the example of dances of the Hopi people (which she studied from 1965 and 1968) to dismiss many of these inaccuracies, arguing that the Hopi dances are “immaculately organized, and never frenzied…” (538).
    - Definitions: She introduces her anthropological definition of ethnic dance, a phrase which, “convey(s) the idea that all forms of dance reflect the cultural traditions within which they develop” (533). For Kealiinohomoku, all dance is ethnic dance.
    - Ethnicity of Ballet: In this section, Kealiinohomoku argues that ballet is ethnic, in the sense that its aesthetic qualities reflect its origin heritages, and that it is not acultural. She highlights “chivalry, courting, weddings, Christenings, burial and mourning customs” are presented in ballets, as well as “aesthetic values” in long, extended, slender bodies of dancers. Ballet’s ethnicity can also be seen in the “flora and fauna” of the stage, including “horses and swans...grains, roses and lilies” (546). She continues to analyze the ways that dance history has mis-defined the term “ethnic” to mean “heathen, pagan, savage, or more recently, exotic” (546), and argues that to use the term appropriately would be to consider all dances ethnic..
    - Reception: Many scholars have responded to Kealiinohomoku’s text as well as have used it as a jumping off point for their own research. In “On Dance Ethnography”, Deidre Sklar offers an application of Kealiinohomoku’s approach, exploring how an ethnographic approach to dance offers cultural context to movement. She incorporates physical movement and discovery through kinesthetic empathy as imperative research methods. Referencing Keallinohomoku’s work and building upon it she concludes, “My point is that, not only does every dance genre emerge from and depend upon cultural traditions, so does every dance researcher and writer. Cultural background influences what one perceives and how one interprets what she perceives” (8). Sklar’s work is just one of many pieces of a progressive cultural project.
- "Music and dance of the Hawaiian and Hopi peoples", Richard L. Anderson and Karen L. Field (editors). Art in small scale societies: contemporary readings: pp. 334–348. Englewood Cliffs, New Jersey.: Prentice-Hall 1993
- "Theory and methods for an anthropological study of dance", 1976 PhD dissertation, published in book form in 2008
- “The would-be Indian,” Charlotte J. Frisbie (editor), Explorations In ethnomusicology: essays in honor of David McAllester, pp. 111–126. Detroit Monographs in Musicology Number 9. Detroit: Information Coordinators in Detroit. 1986
  - 1967, "Hopi and Polynesian dance: a study in cross-cultural comparison,"Ethnomusicology, 11:343-368

=== Encyclopedia articles ===
- 1970, "Hula" The Encyclopedia Americana 14:542, Danbury, Connecticut: Grolier, Inc. reprinted in subsequent editions., 2002
- 1994, "Dance," Native America in the Twentieth Century: An Encyclopedia, Mary B. Davis, ed. Garland Reference Library of Social Science, vol. 452:164-169. NY & London: Garland (corrected paperback edition in 1995)
- 1995, "Dance in traditional religions," HarperCollins, Encyclopedia of Religion, Jonathan Z. Smith, general ed., Sam D. Gill, area ed.: 304-307. San Francisco: Harper San Francisco
- 1996, "Gestures," American Folklore: an encyclopedia, Jan Harold Brunvand, general editor: Garland Reference Library, of the Humanities vol. 1551:333-335. NY & London: Garland.
- 1998, "Gertrude Prokosch Kurath" " Hopi dance", "Primitive dance." Selma Jeanne Cohen (founding editor), International encyclopedia of dance, New York: Oxford, University Press.
- 1998, "Folk dance," Academic American Encyclopedia, 8:199-201. Barbara Winard, editor. Danbury CT: Grolier. 2002
- 2001, “Music and dance in the United States,” pp. 206–222, volume 3, The United States and Canada, Ellen Koskoff, editor. The Garland Encyclopedia of World Music, NY & London: Garland Publishing Co.
- 2002, "Hula," Grolier Multimedia Encyclopedia, Danbury, Connecticut
- 2008, "Folk Dance", online entry in Encyclopædia Britannica
