= Cross-Cultural Dance Resources =

Non-profit dance research organization

- Abbreviation: CCDR
- Formation: 1981
- Type: Non-profit research organization
- Headquarters: Tempe, Arizona
- President: Pegge Vissicaro
- Main organ: Board of directors
- Website: ccdr.org

Cross-Cultural Dance Resources (CCDR) is a non-profit dance research organization in the United States, formed in 1981 and based in Tempe, Arizona. It maintains a non-lending library devoted to the study of dance, with over 15,000 shelved items plus the archives of Eleanor King, Gertrude Prokosch Kurath and Joann Kealiinohomoku. The organization also produces the CCDR Newsletter (ISSN 1069-7241), which is issued twice per year and provides information on dance research, news, and upcoming events. In 2000, the organization was recognized for a special preservation award by the Dance Heritage Coalition, as well as being recognized by the White House Millennium Council, as part of "Save America's Treasures".

== Description ==
Founded in 1981, the CCDR's mission is to promote dance resources, preserve and research dance materials, and foster a dynamic environment for dance events. It provides consultation on dance theory and methods, ethnomusicology, cultural dynamics and ethics. The organization sponsors concerts and visiting artists and lectures. CCDR also maintains a non lending library of over 15,000 shelved items, including artwork, audiovisual materials, books, clippings, monographs, periodicals, costumes, dolls, and musical instruments, as well as the archives of Gertrude Prokosch Kurath, Eleanor King, Joann Kealiinohomoku (in progress), and the Daniel J. Crowley musical instrument collection.

Since 1989, the organization's director is Joann Kealiinohomoku, known for her 1970 essay, "An Anthropologist Looks at Ballet as a Form of Ethnic Dance." and "Theory and methods for an anthropological study of dance", her 1976 doctoral dissertation.

The CCDR receives partial funding from the National Endowment for the Arts and the Arizona Commission on the Arts. It has a library which is open to the public Monday through Friday from 10–5, and by appointment. It is also searchable online.

In 2008, it was announced that the CCDR's collections were being transferred to the Herberger College of the Arts at Arizona State University, Dance Department. The organization's vice president, Elsie Ivancich Dunin, made a gift to the college to provide for the collection's permanent care and curation.

== Awards ==
In 2000, CCDR was recognized by President Bill Clinton's White House Millennium Council, "Save America's Treasures". The DHC was awarded a grant on behalf of three archives, one in Hawaii, one in Missouri and CCDR in Arizona. CCDR received one third of the grant, specifically for the preservation of the Gertrude Kurath, Eleanor King, and Kealiinohomoku Collections.

== Publications ==
- Kurath, Gertrude Prokosch. Half a Century of Dance Research
- CCDR Newsletter (ISSN 1069-7241), published twice per year
- Proceedings: CCDR's Symposium: applying dance ethnology and dance research in the 21st century: 6–8 June 2003
- Kealiinohomoku, Joann W., Theory and methods for an anthropological study of dance, 2008 edition
