= Aaron Osborne =

American dancer (1947–1995)

Aaron Kent Osborne (October 16, 1947 – December 13, 1995) was an American modern dancer known for his performances in works by José Limón, Maggie Black and Lar Lubovitch. Also a dance teacher, he was the cofounder of a San Francisco presenting organization, Dancer's Group, and its associated dance school, Footwork Studio.

== Biography ==
Osborne started dancing only during his college years, when he was a premed student at the University of Oregon. He transferred to the Juilliard School, where he studied techniques associated with Martha Graham, Merce Cunningham, and José Limón, whose work he especially admired for its attention to human psychology. Between 1969 and 1974, he performed with the José Limón Dance Company. Limón created the central role of his late dance work Orfeo (1972) especially for Osborne, and he was praised for the strength of his performance in this physically demanding, high-energy role. Other Limón works he danced in included La Piñata (1969), The Unsung (1970), And David Wept (1971), and Carlota (1972).

Osborne subsequently danced with the Lar Lubovitch Dance Company in works such as Time Before the Time After (After the Time Before).

Later in his career, Osborne moved to San Francisco, where he taught modern dance, especially Limón technique. In 1982 he cofounded and served as the artistic director of a pair of nonprofits, Dancer's Group (which presented performances) and Footwork Studio (which offered dance classes); both were housed in a building in the Mission District. After a few years, he left to teach dance at the New Performance Gallery, then the home of the Margaret Jenkins Dance Company. Known as a generous and inspiring teacher, he occasionally taught master classes as well.

Osborne died of AIDS.
