= Katherine Litz =

American dancer, teacher, and choreographer

- Born: July 26, 1912; Denver, Colorado
- Died: December 28, 1978 (aged 66); New York City
- Known for: Dance
- Movement: Black Mountain College
- Spouse: Charles Oscar

Katherine Litz (July 26, 1912, Denver, Colorado – December 19, 1978, New York City,) was an American dancer, teacher, and choreographer. She was a Guggenheim Fellow in 1965.

== Life ==
Litz studied with Martha Graham and Hanya Holm and became known for her humorous and sometimes ironic dance solos. Between 1936 and 1942, Lintz danced with the Doris Humphrey-Charles Weidman modern dance company (Humphrey-Weidman), with a concert group organized by Agnes de Mille, and performed on Broadway in Oklahoma! and Carousel (musical).

Litz was recruited to teach at Black Mountain College by American artist-dancer Elizabeth Jennerjahn in the late 1940s. While at Black Mountain College, in 1950-51 she collaborated with American composer Lou Harrison to create "Glyph." At Black Mountain College she taught Viola Farber, a founding member of the Merce Cunningham Dance Company.

Litz married American artist and set designer Charles Oscar.

== Solo choreography and performances ==
Although not part of a permanent company or associated with a particular school of dance, she was best known for developing and regularly performing a set of solo pieces: Daughter of Virtue (1949), Fire in the Snow (1949), Blood of the Lamb (1950), The Long Night (1950), The Glyph (1951), And No Birds Sang (1952), Super Duper Jet Girl (1953), Vaudeville: Madame Belinda Bender's Dancing School (1953), The Story of Love from Fear to Flight (1953), and Homage to Lillian Gish (1978).

=== The Glyph ===
While at Black Mountain College in 1950–51, Litz collaborated with American composer Lou Harrison and several students and teachers to create "The Glyph," a multimedia work that included painted backdrop by Ben Shahn, music by Harrison with piano accompaniment by David Tudor, and poetry by Charles Olson, and danced by Litz. Litz's choreography in the piece has been described as "groundbreaking." As Litz described its origins, "The common idea of a Glyph expressed by the different art forms was simply a compound image contained in a single work."

Litz performed the piece in the 1977 New York Dance Festival, where it was filmed. In 2015 and 2016, The Glyph was re-created by dancer Polly Motley and directed by Richard Colton in conjunction with the exhibition Leap Before You Look: Black Mountain College, 1933–1957 at the ICA Boston, and the Hammer Museum in Los Angeles.
