= The Trial (2014 opera) =

2014 opera by Philip Glass

- Opera by Philip Glass
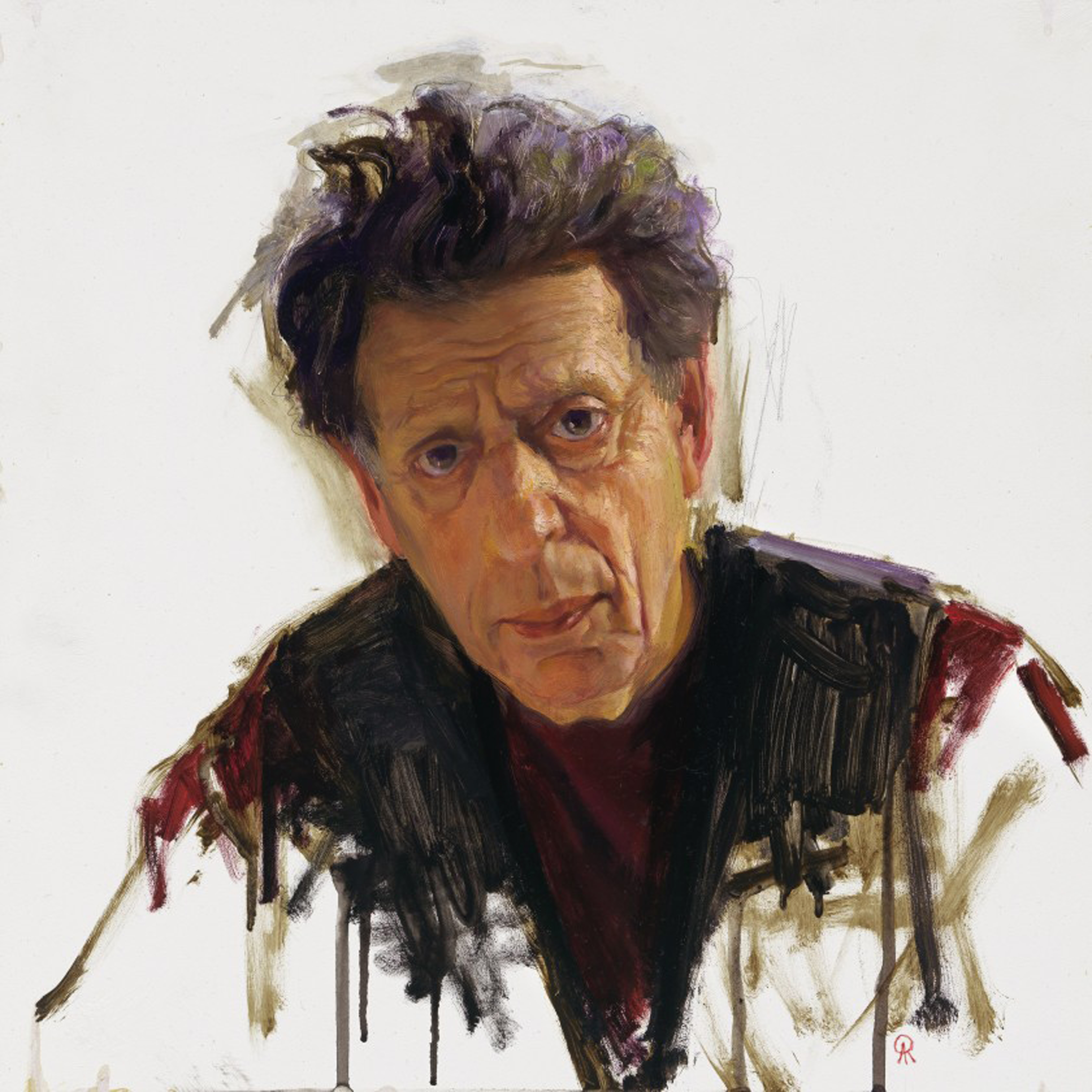
- Portrait of Glass by Luis Alvarez Roure, 2016
- Librettist: Christopher Hampton
- Based on: The Trial by Franz Kafka
- Premiere: 10 October 2014; Linbury Studio Theatre, Royal Opera House, London

The Trial is an English-language opera in two acts, with music by Philip Glass to a libretto by Christopher Hampton, based on the 1925 eponymous novel by Franz Kafka. The opera was a joint commission between Music Theatre Wales, the Royal Opera House, London, Theater Magdeburg and Scottish Opera.

As produced by Music Theatre Wales, the opera received its world premiere on 10 October 2014, in a production by Music Theatre Wales at the Linbury Studio Theatre, Royal Opera House, Covent Garden (London). The German premiere at the Theater Magdeburg occurred on 2 April 2015. Scottish Opera first staged the work at the Theatre Royal Glasgow on 24 January 2017. The North American premiere was on 4 June 2017 at Opera Theatre of Saint Louis. For all of these stagings, Michael McCarthy was the stage director, and the set design was by Simon Banham, both from Music Theatre Wales.

This work, Glass' 26th opera, is the third opera collaboration between Glass and Hampton. Hampton has acknowledged that the initial idea for an opera based on The Trial originated with Glass. Glass has described the opera as one of his 'pocket operas', with respect to the size of the instrumental ensemble and the number of singers required, with all of the singers, except the baritone in the role of Josef K., performing multiple roles.

Glass dedicated the score to Music Theatre Wales in commemoration of its 25th anniversary. He had approved of the company's earlier stagings of his operas, and offered them a reduction in his standard commission fee to reduce the financial burden on the organisation for this commission and production.

== Roles ==
Roles, voice types, premiere casts
Role	Voice type	London premiere cast, 10 October 2014 Conductor: Michael Rafferty	Magdeburg premiere cast, 2 April 2015 Conductor: Hermann Dukek	North America premiere cast, 4 June 2017 Conductor: Carolyn Kuan
Josef K.	baritone	Johnny Hereford	Johnny Hereford	Theo Hoffman
Franz (Guard 1)	tenor	Michael Bennett	Markus Liske	Joshua Blue
Willem (Guard 2)	baritone	Nicholas Folwell	Thomas Florio	Robert Mellon
The Inspector	bass	Michael Druiett	Paul Sketris	Matthew Lau
Frau Grubach	mezzo-soprano	Rowan Hellier	Sylvia Rena Ziegler	Sofia Selowsky
Fräulein Bürstner	soprano	Amanda Forbes	Julie Martin du Theil	Susannah Biller
Magistrate	baritone	Gwion Thomas	Roland Fenes	Keith Phares
Berthold, a student	tenor	Paul Curievici	Michael J Scott	Brenton Ryan
Bailiff	baritone	Gwion Thomas	Roland Fenes	Robert Mellon
Clerk of the court	baritone	Nicholas Folwell	Thomas Florio	Robert Mellon
Washerwoman, the bailiff's wife	mezzo-soprano	Rowan Hellier	Sylvia Rena Ziegler	Sofia Selowsky
A flogger	tenor	Paul Curievici	Michael J Scott	Brenton Ryan
Uncle Albert	bass	Michael Druiett	Paul Sketris	Matthew Lau
Huld	baritone	Gwion Thomas	Roland Fenes	Keith Phares
Block	tenor	Michael Bennett	Markus Liske	Joshua Blue
Leni	soprano	Amanda Forbes	Julie Martin du Theil	Susannah Biller
Titorelli	tenor	Paul Curievici	Michael J Scott	Brenton Ryan
Priest	baritone	Nicholas Folwell	Thomas Florio	Robert Mellon
First executioner	tenor	Michael Bennett	Markus Liske	Joshua Blue
Second executioner	baritone	Nicholas Folwell	Thomas Florio	Robert Mellon

== Synopsis ==
=== Act 1 ===
On his 30th birthday, a bank manager, Josef K., is arrested at his flat for an unidentified crime. Neither the guards, Franz and Willem, nor the police inspector offer any explanation, although all of K.'s neighbours seem to understand better than K. why they are present. Franz and Willem inappropriately look through Josef K.'s belongings, to the latter's annoyance. After observing Josef K.'s reaction to his arrest, the inspector allows K. to go to work.

Later that same evening, K., apologises to his landlady, Frau Grubach, for the disturbance that morning resulting from his arrest. K. meets a fellow tenant, Fräulein Bürstner, and tells her of his arrest. She is drawn to his plight, and he abruptly kisses her.

K. locates the court in an inconspicuous urban block. A washerwoman guides him in, where he learns that everyone there is waiting for him. K. protests the proceedings, and a sudden cry is heard, coming from the washerwoman, as a man presses himself on her. K. speaks in her defence and accuses the court of corruption. The magistrate warns K. that he is damaging his own case.

K. returns to the court for a second hearing, to find that the court is not in session. The washerwoman tells K. that she is the wife of the bailiff. She offers herself to K. and says that she admired his protest, but that she meant her cry to interrupt him. K. examines the Magistrate's books and finds that they contain pornography. Whilst the washerwoman continues her advances toward K., the student Berthold appears and carries her off. The court usher then arrives and registers his disdain that the inhabitants of the court always carry her off. The usher posits the scenario that K. could punish Berthold for his behaviour. K. requires assistance to leave the courtroom.

In his office, K. receives a visit from his uncle Albert, who berates his nephew for concealing his arrest. He then offers to bring K. to an expert barrister. K. reluctantly consents to the visit. Whilst leaving work, K. hears odd noises from another room. A flogger is whipping Franz and Willem, for their misbehaviour during their arrest of K.. When asked about the noises, K. replies that it's 'only a dog'.

=== Act 2 ===
K. and his uncle Albert visit the barrister Huld. Huld's maid, Leni, says that Huld is ailing. K. and Leni exchange glances. K. is surprised to hear that Huld knows all about his trial. Huld remarks on how interesting K.'s case is, and boasts of his standing in legal circles. The sound of a crashing plate in the next room causes K. to take momentary leave. Leni broke the plate deliberately to attract K.'s attention. Whilst seducing him, she suggests that he visit the painter Titorelli for assistance. Uncle Albert interrupts Leni and K. in flagrante, and berates K. for this behaviour, saying that K. has severely damaged his case by his flirtation with Huld's mistress.

K. visits Titorelli in the artist's attic. Noisy neighbouring girls constantly interrupt Titorelli. Titorelli explains that he is acquainted with many judges. He asks K. whether he is innocent, and K. replies yes. K. then states his impression that once the court arrests someone, it is difficult to convince the court of his innocence. Titorelli replies that it is more than difficult, essentially impossible. He tells K. that his trial has three possible outcomes: genuine acquittal, apparent acquittal, or postponement. The last two require continual vigilance, which depresses K.'s spirits. Titorelli sells K. a set of identical paintings as K. departs. K. takes his leave, into what he recognises as the corridor to the court. Titorelli explains that everything there belongs to the court.

At Huld's establishment, Leni is with another of Huld's clients, the businessman Block. K. sees Leni together with Block, and is jealous. Block separately confides to K. that he has 5 other barristers besides Huld on his case, unknown to Huld. He is spending all his money on his case. Block asks for a secret from K. in return. K. says that he intends to dismiss Huld as his barrister. When Huld appears and K. indicates his dispensation of Huld's services, Huld is nonplussed. Huld indicates that he is aware of Block's situation. He humiliates Block before K., querying how Block would react at the knowledge that his trial hasn't even yet begun.

K. is at the city's cathedral, where a priest calls out his name. The priest states his knowledge of K.'s situation, and explains that the verdict of the trial is 'not suddenly pronounced', but instead 'slowly evolves from the proceedings'. He then tells K. a parable of 'The Door of the Law'. K. loses all hope.

On the eve of his 31st birthday, Franz and Willem retrieve Josef K. from his flat. K. does not resist the guards, and briefly sees Fräulein Bürstner as the guards take him away. They take out a knife, pass it between them over his head, and dispatch him, "like a dog".
