= Kitty Doner =

American vaudeville performer and male impersonator (1895–1988)

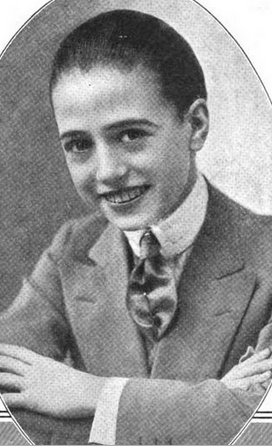
- Kitty Doner, from a 1916 publication

Background information
- Born: Catherine Donohoe; September 6, 1895; Chicago, Illinois, U.S.
- Died: August 26, 1988 (aged 92) Los Angeles, California, U.S.
- Genres: Music hall
- Years active: 1898–1952

Kitty Doner (born Catherine Donohoe, September 6, 1895 – August 26, 1988) was an American vaudeville performer. She was a male impersonator, actress, and dancer, specializing in boy roles, and later in life worked as a choreographer and television producer.

== Early life ==
Catherine Donohoe was born in Chicago, Illinois. Her parents Joe Doner and Nellie Doner, both born in England, were also vaudeville performers, as were her siblings Ted and Rose.

== Career ==
Kitty Doner was considered the best American male impersonator of her day, compared favorably to British acts such as Vesta Tilley and Ella Shields. She was petite, and her characters were often youthful. She was known for changing from masculine to feminine clothing on stage, in view of the audience, to demonstrate how much of her impersonation was skill rather than elaborate costume. In 1921, she performed at a benefit for the Women's Auxiliary of the National Disabled Soldiers League at the Apollo Theater. That same year, she also performed at a benefit for the American Committee for Relief in Ireland, at the Metropolitan Opera House.

Her Broadway credits included The Passing Show of 1913, Dancing Around (1914, with Al Jolson), Robinson Crusoe Jr. (1916, again with Jolson), Sinbad (1918, again with Jolson), and The Dancing Girl (1923, appearing with her brother and sister). Doner's act was preserved in an early sound short film, A Bit of Scotch (1928).

In 1945 she co-produced a now-lost musical television series for CBS, Choreotones, with dancer Pauline Koner. After that, the pair produced some shows for "Holiday on Ice". Koner remembered, "With a famous show biz career behind her, Kitty was still looking for new trends. Her taste was impeccable. A lively force behind the scenes, she was always scouting material and interesting talent." Her last work before retirement was auditioning acts for Ted Mack's Amateur Hour in the early 1950s.

== Personal life ==
Kitty Doner died in 1988, aged 92 years, in Los Angeles, California. There is a collection of Doner's papers, including an unpublished autobiography, photographs and scrapbooks, archived at the University of California Santa Barbara Library.
