= Carolyn Kuan =

Chinese-American conductor (born 1977)

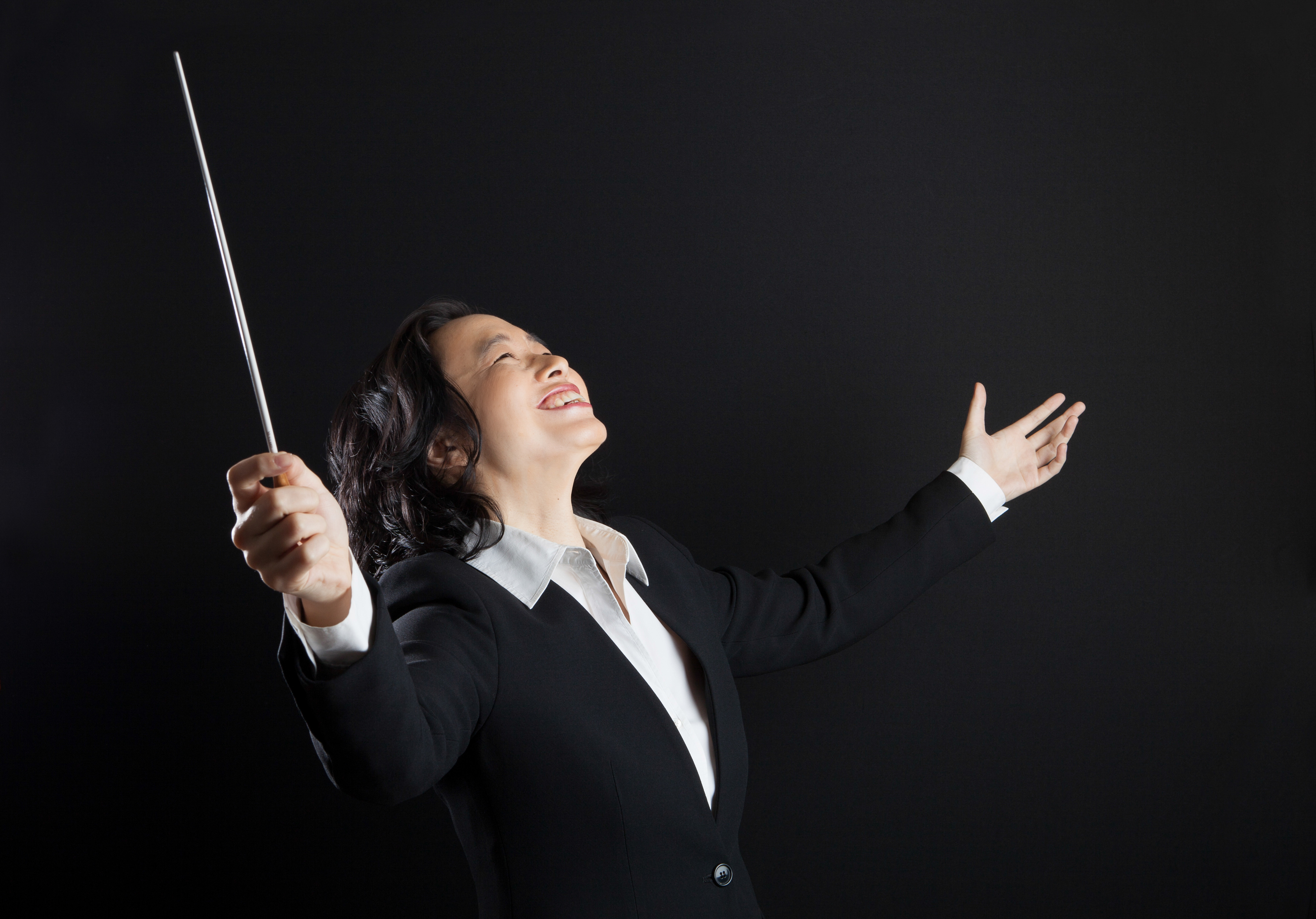

Background information
- Born: Taipei, Republic of China
- Genres: Classical
- Occupation: conductor
- Instrument: piano
- Years active: 2011–present
- Website: www.carolynkuan.com

Carolyn Kuan (born 1977) is an American conductor.

== Biography ==
Carolyn Kuan's family is originally from Guangzhou, China, though Kuan was born in Taipei. When she was five years old, her older brother received a piano as a birthday gift. Kuan convinced her parents to allow her to play the piano. She sang in choirs and had an appreciation for opera, and initially wanted to be an opera singer.

Kuan's middle school had an American "sister school", Northfield Mount Hermon School, where students from Asia could study. At age 14, she traveled by herself to the US to attend Northfield Mount Hermon. Kuan subsequently studied economics (at her parents' request) and music, graduating cum laude from Smith College. At Smith College, she first conducted an orchestra. She continued her music education at the University of Illinois, where she earned a Master of Music degree, and at the Peabody Conservatory, where she earned a performance diploma. Her conducting mentors have included Gustav Meier.

In 2003, Kuan was the first woman to be awarded the Herbert von Karajan Conducting Fellowship, which resulted in a residency at the 2004 Salzburg Festival. She won the first Taki Concordia Fellowship. She began work as a conducting assistant to Marin Alsop at the Cabrillo Festival of Contemporary Music in 2003, and continued to work regularly at Cabrillo through 2012. In 2006, Kuan became assistant conductor of the Seattle Symphony, with a contract of 2 years. In 2007, the orchestra promoted her to associate conductor.

In January 2011, the Hartford Symphony Orchestra named Kuan as its 10th music director, effective at the start of the 2012–2013 season, with an initial contract of 3 seasons. She is the first female and the first Asian-American conductor to hold the post. This appointment represents Kuan's first music directorship. In April 2015, the orchestra announced the extension of Kuan's contract for an additional six seasons, effective 1 June 2016, through May 2022. In January 2016, during a labour dispute between Hartford Symphony Orchestra musicians and management, Kuan offered to reduce her salary 'commensurate' with the pay reductions that management requested of the musicians.

Kuan released her debut album with the Naxos label in 2012, in works by various Chinese composers, featuring the New Zealand Symphony Orchestra. Her other work in contemporary music has included conducting the North American premieres of Huang Ruo's Dr. Sun Yat-sen at Santa Fe Opera in 2014, and of Philip Glass' and Christopher Hampton's The Trial at Opera Theatre of Saint Louis in June 2017.

Cultural offices
| Preceded by Edward Cumming | Music Director, Hartford Symphony Orchestra; 2012–present | Succeeded by incumbent |
