= Pauline Koner =

American dancer and choreographer (1912–2001)

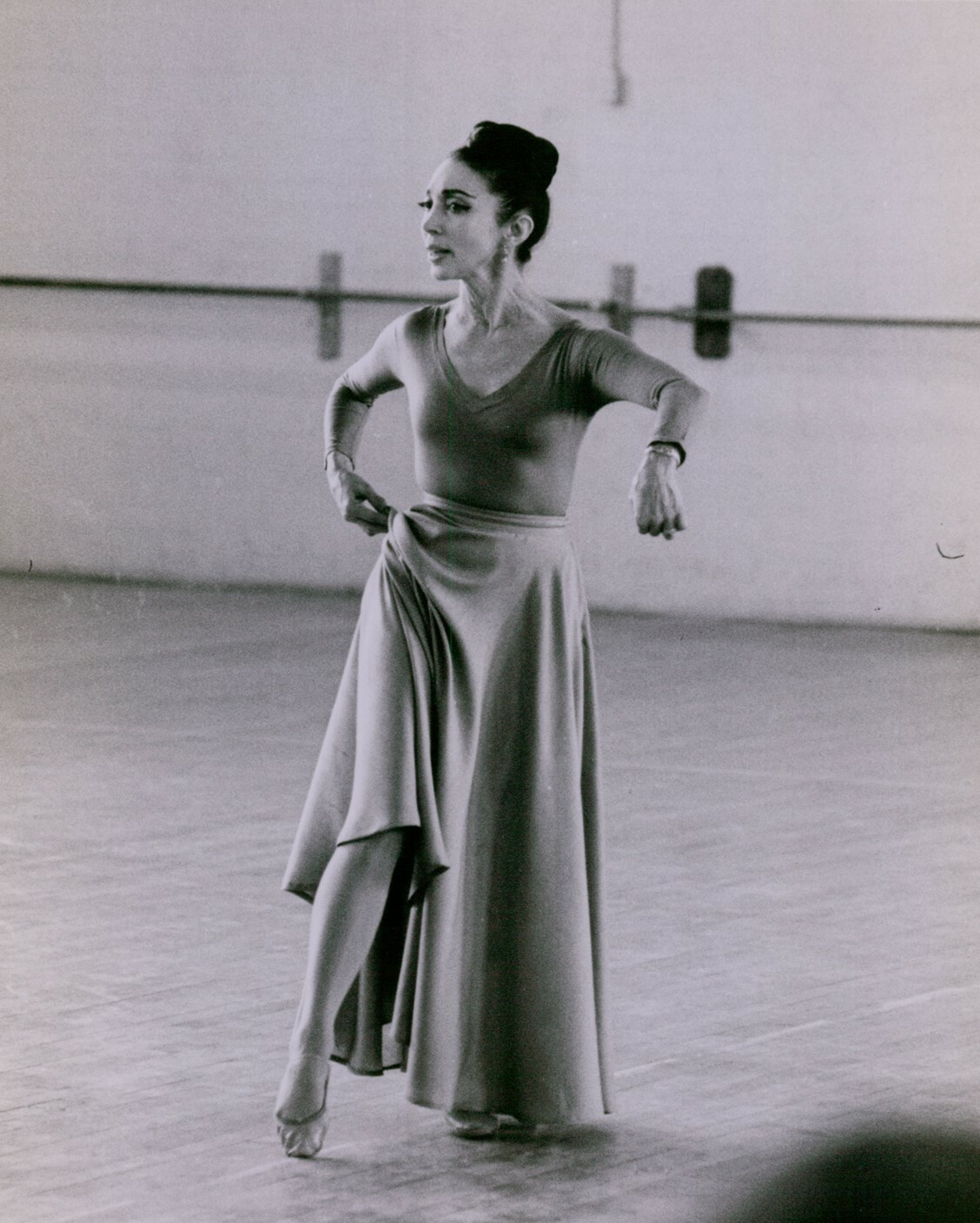
- Koner in 1971
- Born: June 26, 1912; New York City
- Died: February 8, 2001 (aged 88); New York City

Pauline Koner (June 26, 1912 – February 8, 2001) was an American dancer and choreographer. She was best known for her stage shows at the Roxy Theater.

== Early life and education ==
Koner was born in 1912 in New York City to Russian Jewish immigrants. Her father, Samuel Koner, a lawyer, was noted for the medical plan he created for the Workmen's Circle, a Jewish socialist and benevolent organization. After seeing Anna Pavlova in The Dying Swan, Koner was inspired to become a dancer. She studied ballet under Michel Fokine in the 1920s; her father "paid" for the high-priced lessons by offering legal services in exchange. Koner later studied under Angel Cansino. She was a student of the Spanish dance form, as well as the fusion of Asian and Western dance popularized by Japanese choreographers Michio Itō and Yeichi Nimura.

== Career ==
=== Dancer and choreographer ===
Koner's first choreographed piece was presented on December 7, 1930 at the Guild Theatre. She worked as a soloist for 15 years, specializing in ballet, Asian dance, and Spanish dance. Among the countries she toured were Egypt and Palestine in 1932, and the Soviet Union from 1934 to 1936, where she taught as well as performed. After the war, she danced in several companies, including Fokine's, Ito's (1928–29), and José Limón's (1946-1960). With Kitty Doner, Koner developed 11 "Choreotones" for CBS television in 1945. She also produced stage shows at the Roxy Theater and several ice revues, including "Holiday on Ice". She was associated with Doris Humphrey after World War II; she choreographed her best-known dance, The Farewell (1962), in honor of Humphrey.

=== Teacher ===
Koner stopped performing in 1972, but continued to teach in India, Japan, Korea, and Singapore. She led the Pauline Koner Dance Consort from 1976 to 1982. Beginning in 1986, she became a regular lecturer at the Juilliard School.

Her teaching and choreography continue to be recognized, especially her course, Elements of Performing, which she gave at the North Carolina School of the Arts, American Dance Festival, and schools in the US, Europe and Asia. This course focused on performance elements such as "motivation, emotion, focus, dynamics and the use of props, fabrics, lights and sound". She published her autobiography, Solitary Song, in 1989, and Elements of Performance in 1993.

== Awards and honors ==
Koner received the 1963 Dance Magazine award. She also received an honorary degree from Rhode Island College.

== Personal ==
She married Fritz Mahler in 1939. He died in 1973; she died on February 8, 2001, in Manhattan.

== Bibliography ==
- Solitary Song. Duke University Press. 1989. ISBN 0822308789.
- Elements of Performance: A Guide for Performers in Dance, Theatre, and Opera. Taylor & Francis Group. 1993. ISBN 3718653095.

== Links ==
- Archival footage of Pauline Koner performing Reflections in 1991 at Jacob’s Pillow Dance Festival.
