= Arthur Winograd =

Arthur Winograd (April 22, 1920 – April 22, 2010) was the music director of the Hartford Symphony Orchestra and the founding cellist of the Juilliard String Quartet.

Born in New York City, Winograd studied at the New England Conservatory of Music and the Curtis Institute of Music before founding the Juilliard quartet in 1946.

He died from pneumonia in Morristown, New Jersey on his 90th birthday.
