= White Studio =

Early 20th century New York City photographic agency

White Studio was an American photographic agency active between 1903 and 1939 in New York City, best known for its photos of Broadway productions and performers. It was founded by saloonkeeper Luther S. White, and operated a team of production photographers and a portrait studio on Broadway.

White Studio was dominant in production photography in the New York theater scene between 1905 and 1925, and specialized in panoramas of dress rehearsals and performances. They photographed performers such as Bessie McCoy, Aida Overton Walker, and Adele Astaire.

After the agency ceased operation, its archives were acquired by the Theater Collection of the New York Public Library,, which asserts that they document "more than 85% of all live performances of theater and vaudeville in New York".
