= Oak Creek, Arizona =

Populated place in Yavapai County, Arizona

- Populated place
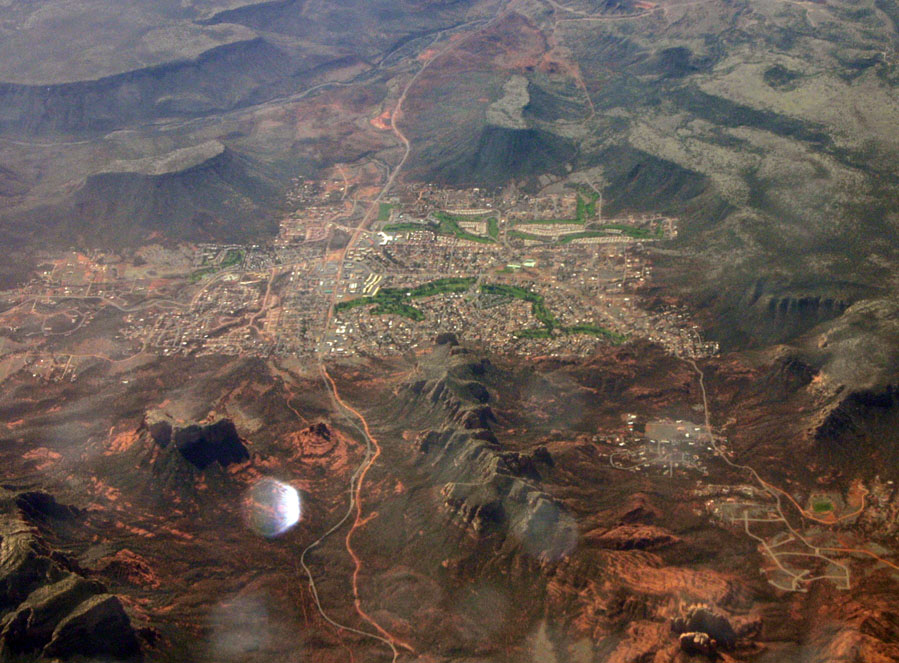
- Aerial view of Oak Creek

- Location within the state of Arizona Oak Creek (the United States)
- Coordinates: 34°46′45″N 111°45′48″W
- Country: United States
- State: Arizona
- County: Yavapai
- Elevation: 4,062 ft (1,238 m)
- Time zone: UTC-7 (Mountain (MST))
- Area code: 928
- FIPS code: 04-50355
- GNIS feature ID: 32426

Oak Creek is a populated place situated in Yavapai County, Arizona, United States.
