= Charles Weidman =

American choreographer, dancer and teacher

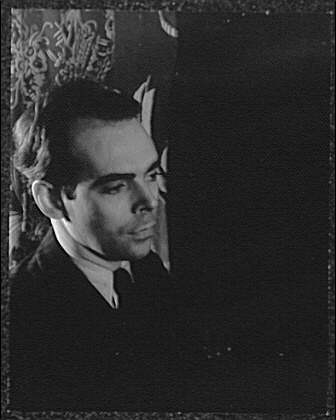
- Portrait of Charles Weidman by Carl Van Vechten, Dec. 4, 1933
- Born: July 22, 1901; Lincoln, Nebraska, US
- Died: July 15, 1975 (aged 73); New York City, US
- Known for: Choreography
- Movement: Modern dance

Charles Weidman (July 22, 1901 – July 15, 1975) was a renowned choreographer, modern dancer and teacher. He is well known as one of the pioneers of modern dance in America. He sought to break free from the traditional movements of dance forms popular at the time to create a uniquely American style of movement. Born in 1901, he choreographed from the 1920s until his death in 1975. While he is most famous for his work with Doris Humphrey, Weidman did much work on his own. He created a bridge to a new range of movement that he only began to explore. His work inspired many and helped to create a whole genre of dance that is still evolving today.

== Career ==
Charles Weidman began choreographing in a time of great change in American culture. He began his career as a dancer for the Denishawn Company, but soon decided to break free from their exotic style of movement and create a new style that was unique to America. He started the Humphrey-Weidman Company with Doris Humphrey in 1927, right in the midst of the Roaring Twenties. During this decade, society, art and culture were blossoming and thriving. Jazz music began to flourish, dancing became a popular activity, technology flourished, and the United States enjoyed a general sense of economic development. According to Weidman, "It was a positive time, one that said yes to human values, a time full of vitality, there was that urgent need to express oneself but also to express the time in which one lived. There was a belief in the future". In a time when change was coming rapidly and innovations were popular, Weidman brought this to the dance world and changed dance forever. While Weidman began his choreography during this immense time of change, he also choreographed for four decades after he began. He worked through the Great Depression, the New Deal, and World War II. Although his work is not very political, his themes and ideas were designed to embody American culture.

== Ideas about dance ==
Charles Weidman wanted to create a uniquely American style of movement. He wanted to develop movement that was not based on animals or bugs or fairy tale stories like the common themes in popular ballets. He also wanted to break free from the current ideas of modern dance embodied by the Denishawn Company (of which he was a member). He wanted to "dance man and woman in America today". He was most famous for his work with Doris Humphrey, with whom he started the Humphrey-Weidman Company. The two met when they were dancing in the Denishawn Company (of Ted Shawn and Ruth St. Denis) and they soon after decided to create a dance company that built off a "dance style that sprang from American Soil". Weidman's work was completely new to the dance world because he was trying to break away from ballet's nature of defying gravity to create a dance style that gave in to the natural "pull of gravity".

== Technique ==
Weidman's movement vocabulary was based on gravity. In concentrating on this element, the "fall was rediscovered." The idea was to explore how giving into gravity makes one fall, while balancing one's body against gravity could create movement as well. In addition, he emphasized the movements that occurred before and after falling. From these ideas came suspension, or the "body's resistance to gravity"; and succession, or the "progressive unfolding of the body as an impulse flows from joint to joint". This created a whole new vocabulary of movements, which included much floor work, jumping, and falling. In addition to his unique new way of moving, Weidman brought a personal element to the dance world: his dramatic abilities. "Arguably, no one has dramatic skill equal to Weidman". His choreography was expressive and usually very emotional. His work's emotions ranged from comedy to seriousness—yet the expression is always important and always present in his choreography.

== Choreographic themes ==
Weidman was also well known for the range of choreographic styles in which he worked. He worked in several different elements including religious, comedic, tributary and serious work. Arguably his most famous work, Flickers, was a comedic sketch of silent films, filled with "jerky movements and corny situations". The piece is cut into four different reels that are four different stories or scenes. The pieces are very theatrical and comedic with many exaggerated facial expressions. Racial and sex stereotypes are exaggerated to a point of hilarity. In stark contrast Weidman choreographed a series called Atavisms which consisted of three pieces: Lynch Town, a choreographic depiction of a carnal and bloodthirsty mob acting like vultures about to devour their prey, Bargain Counter, and Stock Exchange. Weidman's work This Passion, a suite of dances depicting popular murder cases, also gained renown. Another of Weidman's major works was Brahms Waltzes, which was dedicated to Doris Humphrey "because it was the kind of movement she loved and could dance so beautifully". Contrasted against that again was a series of dances made as tributes to his mother's side of the family, called On My Mother's Side; this featured a succession of dances based on different members of his mother's side of the family. His later work includes his Oratorios, centered on religious themes, and of which Daniel Clay wrote: "It is a work magnificent in its scope and power and is arguably Mr. Weidman's master opus."

== Legacy ==
Weidman changed the way dance was danced by working in different parameters. His contributions to the field were recognized when he received the Heritage Award in 1970. One of his former dancers said "all male dancers took concepts from Charles." In his company he trained famous choreographers such as José Limón, Bob Fosse and Louis Falco. Charles Weidman created a new style of dance by rejecting ballet and embracing gravity. He helped lay the foundations for modern dance and many of his ideas are still the basis for modern dance today. Unfortunately, his work is not well known and has been hard to reconstruct because very little of it is on tape and only some of it is in Labanotation. Therefore, it has been up to his former dancers to reconstruct most of his works from memory. However, his passion, influence and ideas have had an important influence on the way movement is studied and created today.

Weidman was inducted into the National Museum of Dance's Mr. & Mrs. Cornelius Vanderbilt Whitney Hall of Fame in 1987.

== See also ==
- List of dancers
