= White House Millennium Council =

Council as part of the 2000 celebrations

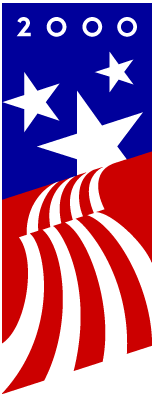
White House Millennium Council logo

The White House Millennium Council was an American organization established by Executive Order 13072 in 1998 by President Bill Clinton as part of the then-upcoming celebrations of the start of the year 2000. The council's theme was "Honor the Past – Imagine the Future."

== Council activities ==
The council was headed by First Lady Hillary Rodham Clinton, and during a two-year period it engaged in numerous activities surrounding the millennium; for example, a time capsule was created, which included various recordings, a state flag, a photo of Rosa Parks, a piece of the Berlin Wall, a film of Neil Armstrong's walk on the Moon and other items. The capsule is designed to be opened in 2100, and is stored by the National Archives and Records Administration. Students were challenged to imagine traveling to and living on Mars by 2030.

The President and the First Lady hosted Millennium Evenings, a series of lectures and cultural showcases designed to highlight contributions of Americans in arts, sciences and other areas. Historian Bernard Bailyn delivered the inaugural evening lecture on the "deeper past" and the "founding of the nation", with remarks by Bill Clinton that underwent several drafts. Jack N. Rakove, Bailyn's doctoral student, had served as an advisor to Chelsea Clinton at Stanford University. Bailyn's lecture went "straight to the point: that in our public life we Americans...live remarkably close to our past...200 years to the founding of the nation" and well before. He reminded his audience that, "despite all the differences that separate our world from the eighteenth century, we are contemporaries of [John] Adams in venerating government but fearing power, and in protecting rights that can never be finally defined or limited in number. But we are contemporaries of our deeper past in an even more complex and profound way...The gap between the real and the ideal remains, far narrower than in Adams' and [Thomas] Jefferson's time, but still achingly wide."

== White House Millennium Celebration ==
The White House Millennium Celebration on December 31, 1999, included several events, and was televised internationally. Nathan D. Baxter, then-Dean of Washington National Cathedral, was selected to deliver the prayer for the nation; Terry McAuliffe, a friend of the Clintons, chaired a dinner celebration at the White House.

== See also ==
- Save America's Treasures
- National Millennium Trail
