= Herberger Institute for Design and the Arts =

Art school of Arizona State University

Coordinates: 33.4191°N 111.9362°W

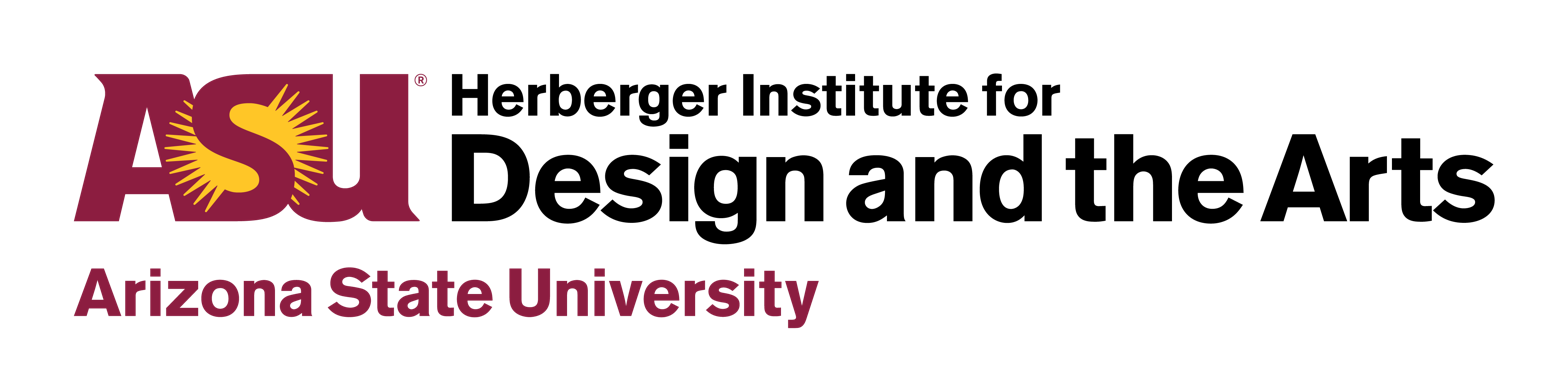
- Type: Public
- Established: (merged 2009)
- Dean: Renée Cheng
- Students: 8,000+
- Location: Tempe, Arizona, U.S.
- Campus: Urban
- Website: herbergerinstitute.asu.edu

The Herberger Institute for Design and the Arts at Arizona State University is one of the largest comprehensive design and arts colleges in the nation. It comprises six schools: ASU FIDM; the School of Art; the School of Arts, Media and Engineering; The Design School; The Sidney Poitier New American Film School; and the School of Music, Dance and Theatre. It also houses the ASU Art Museum and the ASU FIDM Museum, LA's only fashion museum. The Herberger Institute operates across two states and four cities, including Los Angeles, as well as online.

In 2024, architect and educator Renée Cheng was named the new dean of the Herberger Institute, succeeding Steven Tepper, who served as dean and director of the institute for 10 years before his inauguration as the 21st president of Hamilton College. Cheng’s role at ASU also includes serving as senior vice provost.

The Herberger Institute for Design and the Arts at Arizona State University in Tempe, Arizona was created in 2009 by the merger of two existing academic units, the Katherine K. Herberger College of the Arts and the College of Design. The Arizona Board of Regents approved the merger on April 30, 2009.

== Units ==
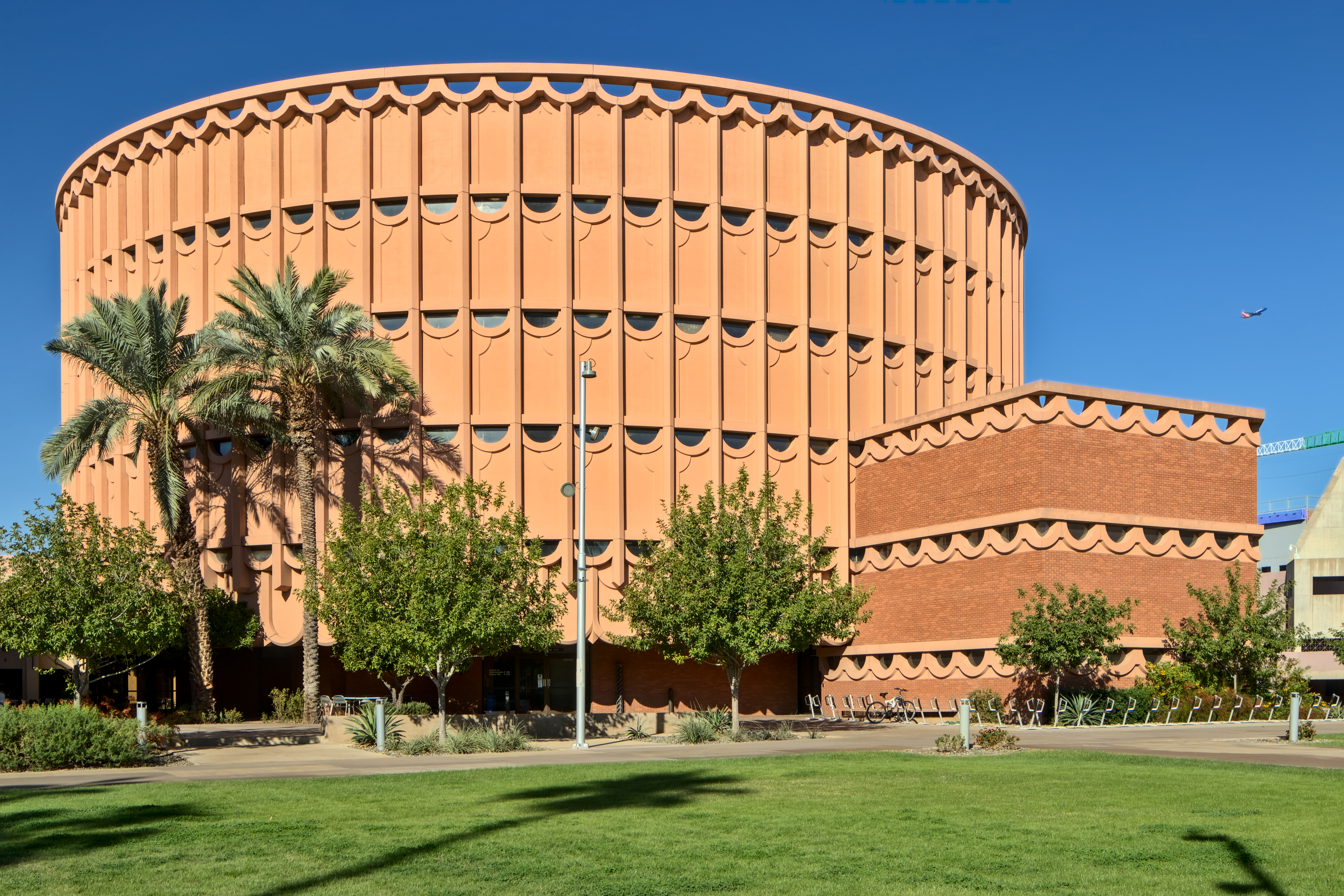
Evelyn Smith Music Theatre

- ASU FIDM
- School of Art
- School of Arts, Media and Engineering
- The Design School
- The Sidney Poitier New American Film School (previously known as the School of Film, Dance, and Theatre, renamed in 2020
- School of Music, Dance and Theatre
- ASU Art Museum

== Deans ==
- James Elmore, dean, College of Design, 1964
- Henry A. Bruinsma, dean, College of Fine Arts, 1964–1975
- William Arnold, acting dean, College of Fine Arts, 1975–1976
- Jules Heller, dean, College of Fine Arts, 1976–1985
- Walter Harris, acting dean, College of Fine Arts, 1985–1986
- Seymour L. Rosen, dean, College of Fine Arts, 1986–1994
- Robert Wills, dean, College of Fine Arts, 1994–2006
- Wellington "Duke" Reiter, dean, College of Design, 2003–2008
- Kwang-Wu Kim, dean, Herberger College of Fine Arts, 2006–2009; Herberger Institute for Design and the Arts 2009–2013
- Michael Underhill, interim dean, Herberger Institute for Design and the Arts, 2013–2014
- Steven J. Tepper, dean and director, Herberger Institute for Design and the Arts, 2014–2024
- Renée Cheng, dean, Herberger Institute for Design and the Arts, and senior vice provost, ASU, 2024—present

== Awards ==
In 2017, the National Endowment for the Arts (NEA) awarded $100,000 to Herberger Institute in partnership with Center for Performance and Civic Practice.

== See also ==
- History of Arizona State University
- Cross-Cultural Dance Resources
