= Humphrey-Weidman =

Dance technique

Humphrey-Weidman is a modern dance technique consisting of "fall" and "recovery" (losing and regaining equilibrium) that was invented by Doris Humphrey and Charles Weidman. In 1928 Humphrey and Weidman founded a dance school to teach their technique and a dance company to perform it; both were disbanded by Humphrey in the 1940s.

== See also ==
- Eleanor King
