= Major Felten =

American artist

Major Felten, also spelled Felton (1904–1975), was an American visual artist and illustrator. He produced modernism-style designs in charcoal drawings and other media.

== Early life ==
Felten was born March 19, 1904, in Canaan, Connecticut. He spent much of his life in Darien, Connecticut.

== Career ==
Felten became known for his posters and book illustrations during the 1930s to 1950s. Some of his posters were published by Davis Blue Artwork, a company founded by Robert Blue and Brian Davis.

Felten provided illustrations for the Ives Washburn 1931 edition of Baudelaire's translated poems The Flowers of Evil.

Felten produced an illustration in the style of Commercial Modernism for the January, 1934, issue of Ladies' Home Journal.

A Major Felten charcoal illustration was used as the basis of the design on a folding screen in a Darien, Connecticut, home featured in a 1936 article in Architecture Magazine.

In 1938, Felten produced illustrations of dancers Barton Mumaw and Ted Shawn. He produced posters for the Jacob's Pillow dance festival and maintained correspondence with the organization from 1947 to 1971.

Felten produced the cover illustration of the brochure for the 1940 Railroads at the New York World's Fair by the Eastern Railroad Presidents Conference.

Also in the 1940s, Felten illustrated several books by Helen Dore Boylston, including her Carol Page and Sue Barton series.
