= Marion Rice =

American dance choreographer, teacher and producer

- Marion Rice in Ruth St Denis' Tunisienne 1940
- Born: Marion Burbank Stevens; September 9, 1904; Hingham, Massachusetts, Massachusetts, U.S.
- Died: April 12, 1995 (aged 90); Fitchburg, Massachusetts, U.S.
- Education: Sullins College, Bristol, Virginia
- Occupations: Dancer, teacher, choreographer, producer
- Years active: 1928–1990
- Spouse: James Parker Rice
- Children: Carolyn Brown, James Parker Rice, Jr.

Marion Burbank Stevens Rice (September 9, 1904 – April 12, 1995) was an American modern dance performer, choreographer, dance teacher, and producer.

== Early life ==
Rice was born in Hingham, Massachusetts. She studied ballet at Sullins College. She settled in Fitchburg, Massachusetts and founded the "Marion Rice Studio of the Dance" where she taught and performed Denishawn technique for over 60 years. She studied in the late 1920s and early 1930s with Ted Shawn, Ruth St. Denis, Miriam Winslow and the Braggiotti sisters at the Braggiotti-Denishawn School of Dance in Boston, often performing Denishawn works in their concerts.

== Other work ==
She produced works by Ruth St. Denis and Ted Shawn as well as her own choreography. Among the dancers and choreographers she trained were her daughter Carolyn Brown of the Merce Cunningham Dance Company, her daughter-in-law Mona Irvine Rice, her granddaughters Robin Rice and Rebecca Rice (Rebecca Rice Dance and the Pittsburg Dance Alloy), John Duane of the American Ballet Theater, and Valerie Farias of the Pauline Koner Dance Company.

== Dance company ==
She also operated her own dance company, the Marion Rice Denishawn Dancers, and in 1980 staged her version of "Soaring," for Les Grands Ballets Canadiens in Montreal. Marion Rice Denishawn performed at the Jacob's Pillow Dance Festival in 1972, the Marymount Manhattan Theater (New York) in 1976 and City College (New York) in 1986 at the "Roots: Foundations of American Modern Dance Festival"..

Marion Rice Denishawn or Marion Rice Denishawn Dancers is a dance company devoted to preserving Denishawn dance, the choreography of modern dance pioneers Ruth St. Denis and Ted Shawn, taught and staged by Marion Rice. Marion Rice dedicated her creative life to teaching, preserving, protecting, and performing the eighty or more dance works taught to her by Ruth St. Denis, Ted Shawn, Miriam Winslow, and other modern dance luminaries when a student and performer at the Boston Braggiotti School in Boston in the early 1900s. Along with members of her family, daughter Carolyn Brown, daughter-in-law Mona Irvine Rice, granddaughters Robin Rice and Rebecca Rice, these Denishawn dances have been performed by Marion Rice and her students for over 85 years.

Marion Rice Denishawn performed in Fitchburg, Massachusetts as well as at the Jacob's Pillow Dance Festival in 1972, the Marymount Manhattan Theater (New York) in 1977 and City College (New York) in 1986 at the 'Roots: Foundations of American Modern Dance Festival'.

In 2000, Marion Rice Denishawn performed at the "Dance in Millennium" Festival in Washington. The company presented "Boston Braggiotti and Denishawn", a lecture demonstration illuminating a select number of the early Denishawn works.

Village Voice critic Deborah Jowitt wrote about the performance in the following review:

Ruth St. Denis, American mystic, and Ted Shawn, entrepreneur, were a great team. During the glory days of their Denishawn company—roughly 1916 to 1931—a gifted disciple could obtain a franchise and open a Denishawn school. For a price, a young dancer could learn a colorful routine and secure its sheet music and costume design. Last month, two companies—the Marion Rice Denishawn dancers at the "Dancing in the Millennium" conference in Washington, D.C., and Dansarté, at Jacob's Pillow—presented programs of dances by St. Denis, Shawn, and their pupils.

What's intriguing about these dances—learned by Robin and Rebecca Rice at their grandmother's studio, and from Shawn at Jacob's Pillow in 1942 and 1943 by Dansarté's director, Sharry Underwood—is the way they combine the notion of art dance with a vaudeville structure. They tend to be about three minutes long, with reassuring amounts of repetition, structured in A-B-A form. Shawn and St. Denis captured the look and ambience of "exotic" styles, if not their steps. Dansarté's beautiful Maris Wolff, gorgeously costumed, performs an orientalist's dream of an Indian "nautch" dance—all rippling midriff, swaying steps, and flirtatious glances. Rice dancer Laurie Cameron appears for the circa 1930 fantasy La Peri (by either St. Denis or Miriam Winslow, who took over the Boston Denishawn school of the Braggiotti sisters), wafting swags of material that depend from her cap. The heelwork that Dansarté's Jean-Marie Mellichamp beats out in Viva Faroan has the air of flamenco without its now familiar complexities. In the early 20th century, what did American audiences know or care about authenticity?

On these fine programs, you can see the influence of Isadora Duncan in Chopin dances performed with lovely sincerity by the Rices, or get a whiff of German modernism in Miriam Marmein's circa 1932 mime, Argument des Boulevardiers, in which Valerie Farias Newton and Rebecca Rice wear mannish attire and gesticulate with rhythmic fury. Jess Meeker's music for Shawn's Gypsy-Rondo-Bout-Town nudges Dansarté's Genevieve Pellman and Neth Urkiel-Taylor from Haydn to swing. In all these early pieces, theatrical traditions, fashion, and experiment tiptoe toward modern dance.

== Current events ==
In 2000, Marion Rice Denishawn performed in the "Dance in Millennium" Festival in Washington, DC. The company presented "Boston Braggiotti and Denishawn", a lecture demonstration illuminating a select number of the early Denishawn works.

Anna Kisselgoff wrote in the New York Times:

"Marion Rice's stagings of Denishawn works are always fresh and beautiful – the perfect example was the St. Denis Valse No. 14 in which Robin Rice and Rebecca Rice were also swathed in swirling fabric – but much more actively so than in theFuller solo. The amount of basic ballet taught in the Denishawn schools was evident in Robin Rice's luminous performance of Shawn's Red Radiance.
