= Carolyn Brown (choreographer) =

American dancer and writer (1927–2025)

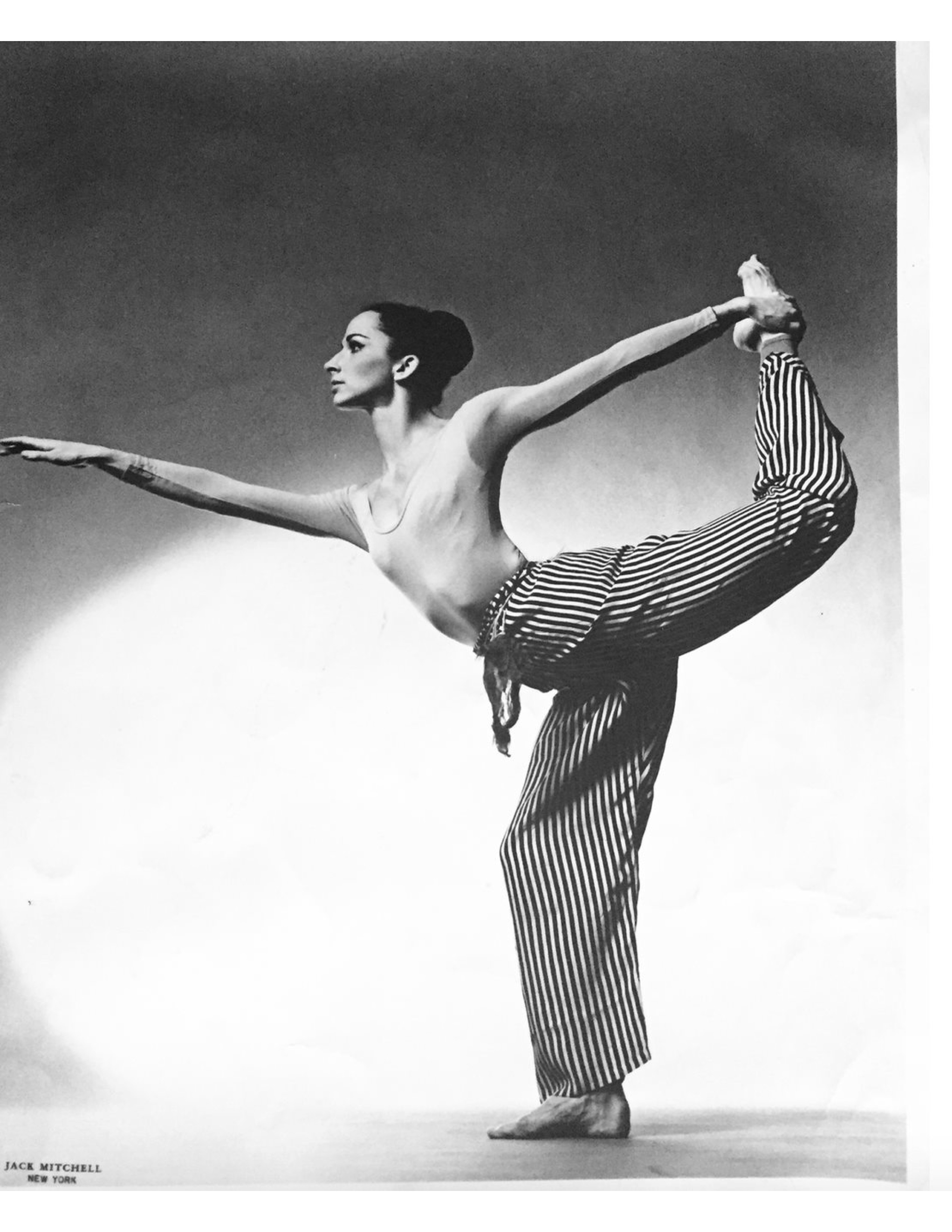
- Leading dancer, Carolyn Brown, with the Merce Cunningham Dance Company
- Born: Carolyn Rice; September 26, 1927; Fitchburg, Massachusetts, U.S.
- Died: January 7, 2025 (aged 97); Millbrook, New York, U.S.
- Education: Denishawn School; Wheaton College, Juilliard School
- Occupations: Dancer; choreographer
- Spouse: Earle Brown (m. 1950; div. 1988)
- Partner: James Klosty
- Mother: Marion Rice

Carolyn Brown (née Rice; September 26, 1927 – January 7, 2025) was an American dancer, choreographer and writer. She was best known for her work as a founding member of the Merce Cunningham Dance Company, and was Cunningham's leading dancer for twenty years. Brown performed in almost every dance choreographed for the company from 1953 to 1972.

== Life and career ==
Brown was born in Fitchburg, Massachusetts, on September 27, 1927, the daughter of James Parker Rice and Marion Burbank Stevens Rice. Coming from a dancing family, she studied with her mother, Marion Rice, in Fitchburg, Massachusetts, who was a student and performer with Ted Shawn at the Boston-Braggiotti Denishawn School in Boston. Brown was a product of the Denishawn School and graduated with honors in philosophy from Wheaton College in 1950.

After attending a masterclass with Cunningham in Denver in 1951, she pursued dance full-time and moved to New York to continue her studies at the Juilliard School. She also studied with Cunningham and became one of the founding members of his company in the summer of 1953. She was the most important female dancer in Cunningham's company for the next twenty years and danced in 40 of his works, often collaborating with Cunningham and John Cage in the creative process. She created a role in Cage's Theatre Piece (1960) and on pointe in Robert Rauschenberg's first dance work Pelican (1963). A dancer of great purity and virtuosity, she was considered the ideal Cunningham interpreter.

In the early days of the company, she was married to composer Earle Brown. They divorced in 1988. Later, she formed a thirty-five year partnership with photographer James Klosty.

Her own choreography includes Car Lot (1968), As I Remember It, a solo in homage to Shawn (Jacob's Pillow, 1972), Bunkered for a Bogey (1973), House Party (1974), Circles (1975), and Balloon II (Ballet-Théâtre Contemporain, 1976).

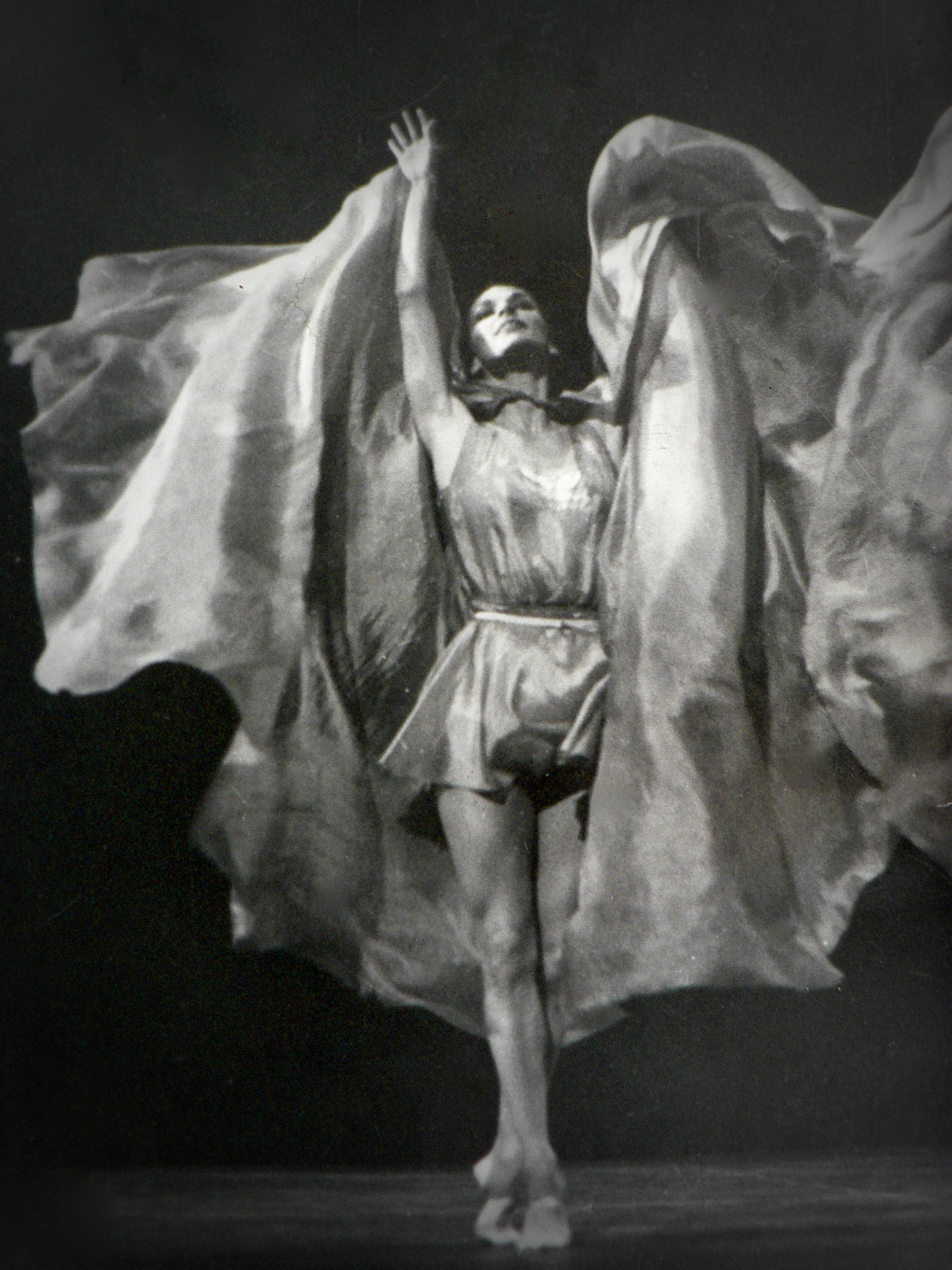
Carolyn Brown performing Valse a la Loie with Marion Rice Denishawn. Jacobs Pillow, 1972. Photo John Van Lund.

Upon retirement in 1973 she took up teaching, and continued to work with the Cunningham company as an artistic consultant. She was a member of the Cunningham Dance Foundation Board of Directors, and worked as a freelance choreographer, filmmaker, writer, lecturer, and teacher. She was awarded the Dance Magazine Award, five National Endowment for the Arts grants, and a John Simon Guggenheim Fellowship. Her writing has been published in The New York Times, Dance Perspectives, Ballet Review, and the Dance Research Journal.

Brown lived in Millbrook, New York. She died at her home there on January 7, 2025, at the age of 97.

== Memoir ==
In 2007, Brown published her memoir Chance and Circumstance: Twenty Years with Cage and Cunningham, which tells the story of her career, of the formative years of the Merce Cunningham Dance Company, and of the two artists at its center – Merce Cunningham and John Cage.
