= Regina Baff =

American actress

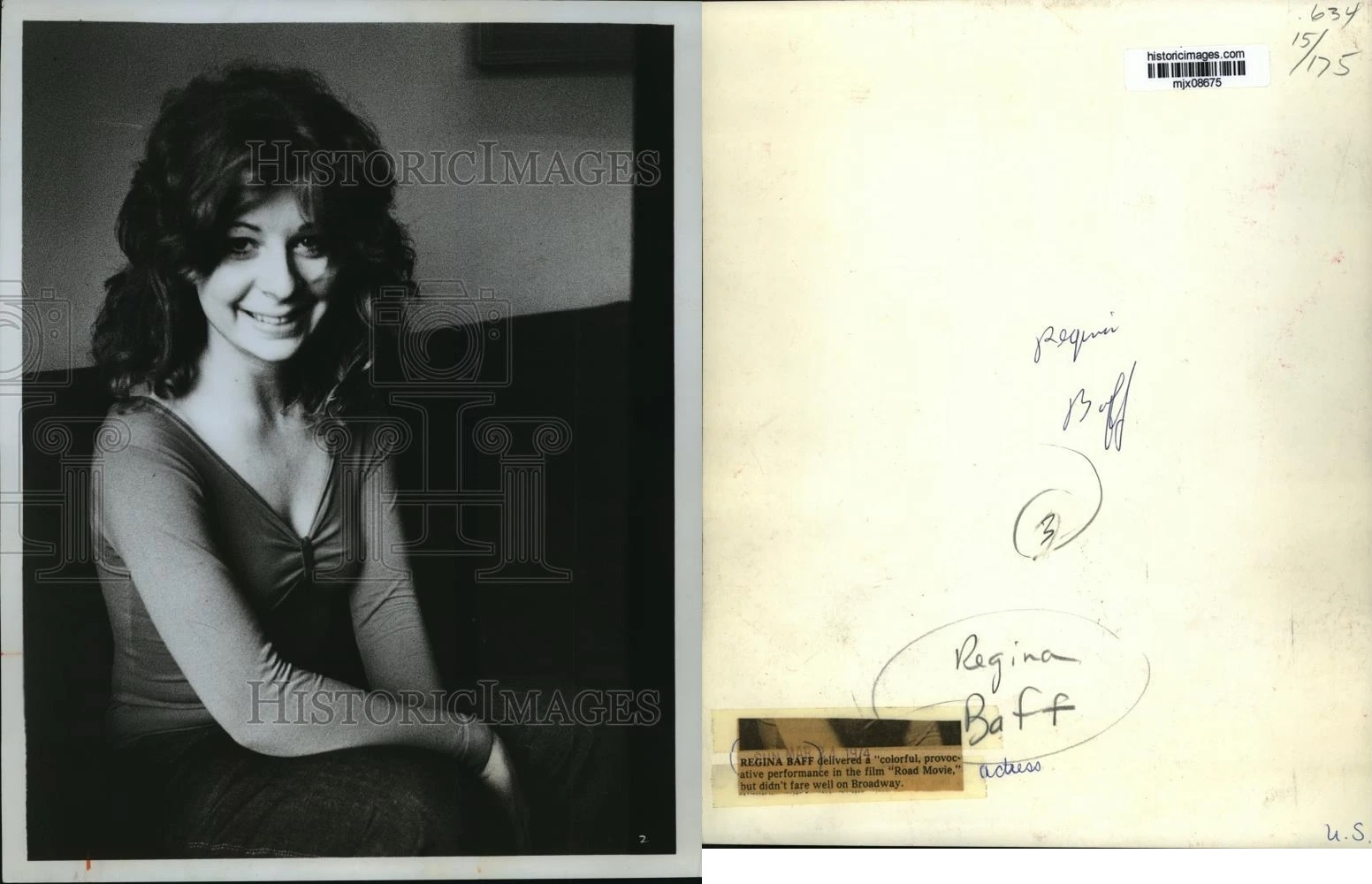
- Baff in 1974
- Occupation: Actress
- Years active: 1971–1989

Regina Baff is an American actress. She was nominated for a Tony Award in 1974 for Veronica's Room.

== Early years ==
Baff was born on March 31, 1949, in the Bronx, New York, grew up there, and attended Bronx High School of Science. Planning to be a veterinarian, she attended Case Western Reserve University for one year. Before her acting career began her jobs included washing dogs and selling soft drinks in a theater.

== Career ==
=== Stage ===
Baff's Broadway credits include Paul Sills' Story Theatre (1970-1971), Ovid's Metamorphoses (1971), 42 Seconds from Broadway (1973), Veronica's Room (1973), and The West Side Waltz (1981-1982) with Katharine Hepburn. Her work off-Broadway includes Rosebloom.

=== Film and television ===
Her film debut came in Who Is Harry Kellerman and Why Is He Saying Those Terrible Things About Me? (1971). She starred in Below the Belt (1980) about lady wrestlers and Road Movie (1974), a film by Joseph Strick about a truck hooker. Her other films included The Paper Chase (1973), The Great Gatsby (1974), Butch and Sundance: The Early Days (1979) and Escape from Alcatraz (1979). On television, she appeared in numerous situation comedies, including an episode of Taxi in which her character gave birth in the backseat of a taxi.

== Personal life ==
Baff has a Ph.D. in psychology, and is sister of Ella Baff, former director of Jacob's Pillow.

== Filmography ==
Regina Baff film and television credits
Year	Title	Role	Notes
1971	Who Is Harry Kellerman and Why Is He Saying Those Terrible Things About Me?	Ruthie Tresh	Film
1971	Made for Each Other	Corrine	Film
1973	The Paper Chase	Asheley Brooks	Film
1973	Road Movie	Janice	Film
1974	The Great Gatsby	Miss Baedeker	Film
1976	The Money	Lucy	Film. AKA Atlantic City Jackpot
1978	Taxi	Ruth	Episode: "Memories of Cab 804: Part 2"
1979	Butch and Sundance: The Early Days	Ruby	Film
1979	Escape from Alcatraz	Lucy	Film
1980	Below the Belt	Rosa Rubinsky	Film
1986	The Equalizer	Susan Donahue	Episode: "Unpunished Crimes"
1989	The Equalizer	Kitty Halsey	Episode: "Suicide Squad"
