= Baff =

Baff is a surname. Notable people with the surname include:

- Barnet Baff (1863–1914), American poultry dealer and murder victim
- Ella Baff, American director
- Josie Baff (born 2003), Australian snowboarder
- Regina Baff, American actress
