= BAFF =

BAFF or Baff may refer to:

- Baff, surname
- BAFF receptor
- B-cell activating factor
- British Air Forces in France
- British Armed Forces Federation
