= David Bauer (actor) =

American actor (1917–1973)

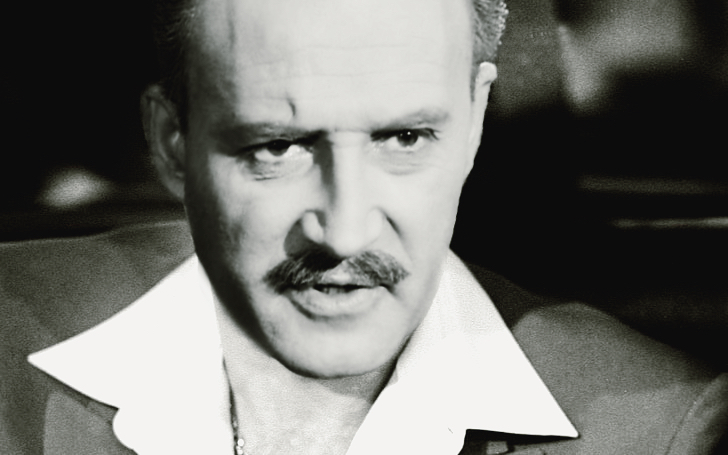
- Born: Herman Bernard Waldman; March 6, 1917; Chicago, Illinois, U.S.
- Died: February 8 or 13, 1973; aged 55; London, England
- Other names: Herman Waldman, David Wolfe
- Education: Washington University in St. Louis
- Occupation: Actor
- Years active: 1941–1973
- Spouses: Rose Cherub (m. 1946–?); Stella Tanner (m. 1960)
- Children: 1

David Bauer (born Herman Bernard Waldman; March 6, 1917 – February 8 or 13, 1973) was an American film, television, and stage actor who, from November 1958 until his death, was based primarily in Britain.

== Early life and career ==
Born in Chicago, Illinois to Leo Waldman and Ida Katz, Waldman attended Washington University in St. Louis, Missouri, graduating in 1938. Aside from his Bachelor of Arts, Waldman was awarded the school's $75 Dramatic Club Prize and, more important, a scholarship to the Berkshire Playhouse in Stockbridge, Massachusetts, where he had a chance to meet, among others, Jane Wyatt, Edith Barrett and Sinclair Lewis, and to perform alongside such actors as Fred Stone, Jane Cowl and Eugenie Leontovich.

After serving in the army from 1943 to 1946, Waldman joined the Actors' Laboratory Theatre in Los Angeles, appearing that year in the west coast premiere of Harry Brown's A Sound of Hunting, wherein, according to Los Angeles Daily News critic David Hanna, Brown's sometimes "overdrawn" supporting characters managed to retain some "semblance of credulity [sic], thanks largely to the finesse of the men who play them. Michael Vincent and Herman Waldman carry the comedy burden with surety and excellent timing."

Waldman's radio credits include ongoing roles in Big Town and Those We Love and at least one appearance on the anthology series Favorite Story.

In the summer of 1948, by which time he had amassed more than 100 stage and radio credits (along with his first feature film), Waldman adopted the stage name David Wolfe, appearing in such films as The Undercover Man, 5 Fingers, Wait Till The Sun Shines, Nellie, and Salt of the Earth.

Following his appearance before the House Un-American Activities Committee, Wolfe was blacklisted; consequently, the professional alias underwent one last tweak, and, as of no later than the December 1956 New York Shakespeare Festival revival of Titus Andronicus, Waldman was being billed as David Bauer.

As David Bauer, he appeared in The Baron, The Champions (where he provided opening narration for each episode), The Avengers, Department S, Gideon's Way, Jason King, The Prisoner, The Protectors, Randall and Hopkirk (Deceased), The Saint, Strange Report, and Undermind.

He appeared in films such as Patton, Inspector Clouseau, Diamonds Are Forever, You Only Live Twice, and The Spy Who Came in from the Cold.

== Personal life and death ==
Bauer was married twice: to Rose Cherub from July 1946 until at least April 1950, and, from 1960 until his death, to British actress Stella Tanner, with whom he had one child, Santa Fe-based actress and disc jockey Alexa Bauer.

David Bauer died of a heart attack at his home in London on either the 8th or 13 February 1973.

== Filmography ==
Year	Title	Role	Notes
1948	The Vicious Circle	Lieber	as Herman Waldman
1949	The Undercover Man	Stanley Weinburg	as David Wolfe
1949	House of Strangers	Prosecutor	Uncredited
1949	Slattery's Hurricane	Dr. Ross	Uncredited
1949	Flaming Fury	Tony Polacheck	as David Wolfe
1949	Sword in the Desert	Gershon	as David Wolfe
1949	Tokyo Joe	Photo Sergeant	Uncredited
1949	A Dangerous Profession	Matthew Dawson	as David Wolfe
1949	Bagdad	Mahmud	as David Wolfe
1950	Prisoners in Petticoats	Sam Clark	as David Wolfe
1950	Side Street	Smitty	Uncredited
1950	Appointment with Danger	David Goodman	as David Wolfe
1950	Where the Sidewalk Ends	Sid Kramer, Scalise Hood	Uncredited
1951	I Can Get It for You Wholesale	Speaker on Dais	Uncredited
1951	Smuggler's Island	Lorca	as David Wolfe
1951	The Mark of the Renegade	Landlord	as Dave Wolfe
1951	Kansas Raiders	Rudolph Tate	as Dave Wolfe
1951	The Scarf	Level Louie	as David Wolfe
1951	The Guest (Short)	Martin Androvitch	as David Wolfe
1952	5 Fingers	Da Costa	Uncredited
1952	The Cimarron Kid	Sam Swanson	as David Wolfe
1952	The Iron Mistress	James Black	Uncredited
1952	Wait 'Til the Sun Shines, Nellie	Sam Eichenbogen	Uncredited
1952	Bloodhounds of Broadway	Counsel	Uncredited
1954	Salt of the Earth	Barton	as David Wolfe
1962	Flat Two	Emil louba	Edgar Wallace Mysteries
1963	Live It Up!	Mark Watson	U.S. ' Sing and Swing '.
1964	Man in the Middle	Colonel Mayburt	
1964	Walk a Tightrope	Ed	
1965	The Spy Who Came in from the Cold	Young Judge	Uncredited
1967	The Double Man	Andrew Miller	
1967	You Only Live Twice	American Diplomat	Uncredited
1967	Danger Route	Bennett	
1967	Torture Garden	Mike Charles	(segment 2 "Terror Over Hollywood")
1968	Dark of the Sun	Adams	(UK title: The Mercenaries)
1968	Inspector Clouseau	Police Chief Geffrion	
1969	Crooks and Coronets	Jack	
1969	The Royal Hunt of the Sun	Villac Umu	
1970	Patton	Lieutenant General Harry Buford	
1971	Fun and Games	Gribney	
1971	Diamonds Are Forever	Morton Slumber	
1972	Embassy	Kadish	
1972	Endless Night	Uncle Frank	
1974	Road Movie	Harry	(final film role)
