= Barton Mumaw =

American dancer and choreographer

Barton Mumaw (August 20, 1912 – June 18, 2001) was an American dancer and choreographer who performed in modern dance concerts and musical theater productions. He was the muse of Ted Shawn, pioneer of modern dance.

== Biography ==
Born in Hazleton, Pennsylvania, and reared in Eustis, Florida, Mumaw began his dance training with a local ballet teacher when he was a boy of fifteen. He also took classes with Berte Rita Lipton, who taught him some fundamentals of modern dance, and he began to study ballet in earnest through a mail-order course from the Veronine Vestoff School of the Ballet in New York City. In 1930, at 18, Mumaw attended a dance program by the Denishawn School of Dancing and Related Arts, the company directed by Ted Shawn and his wife, Ruth St. Denis. It altered the course of his life: entranced by the troupe's choreographic eclecticism and theatrical vividness, he resolved to go to New York to study at Denishawn.

An adept student with physical attributes well suited to dance, Mumaw progressed quickly under Shawn's tutelage. While serving as Shawn's driver and dresser, he joined the Denishawn company and performed in the company's last performance at the Lewisohn Stadium with the New York Philharmonic on August 26, 1931. After Shawn and St. Denis split, Shawn retired to his farm in the Berkshire hills of western Massachusetts and began to teach dance as physical education at a nearby college. The farm, called Jacob's Pillow after a large boulder in the woods, soon became the home of Shawn's all-male dance troupe, known as Ted Shawn and His Men Dancers, and later home of the Jacob's Pillow Dance Festival, which continues to flourish there today. Mumaw joined Shawn's troupe at its inception in 1933 and remained with it until it disbanded in 1940, having toured extensively throughout the United States. The company's athletic style and powerful dances appealed to Depression-era audiences and did much to make dancing seem like a respectable profession for men. Although not billed as such, Mumaw was unquestionably the star dancer of the troupe.

In his memoir, Mumaw reveals that he was Shawn's lover for many years (1931–1948) and records how their involvement affected every aspect of their professional lives. Since same-sex couples were not socially acceptable at the time, the two took great pains to conceal the true nature of their relationship so that no one could accuse dance of being morally questionable. In recognition of his importance in Shawn's life and career and in the development of modern dance, Mumaw is memorialized as the figure on the weather vane atop the Ted Shawn Theater at Jacob's Pillow. His relationship with Shawn ended after having an affair with John Christian and breaking off the relationship to be with Christian. Christian in turn had an affair with Shawn after becoming an employee at Jacob's Pillow, and ended his relationship with Mumaw to become Shawn's longtime domestic partner.

After Shawn's company folded, Mumaw toured the concert dance circuit as a soloist, performing works choreographed for him by Shawn as well as works of his own making. Following America's entry into World War II, in December 1941, Mumaw joined the U.S. Army Air Corps and, after basic training as a mechanic, had the good fortune to be assigned to Special Services, a unit created to produce shows to entertain the troops. As a kind of show-business soldier, he served in the military until the end of the war in 1945.

Upon returning to civilian life, Mumaw revived his theatrical career as a soloist in concerts and pageants staged by former colleagues in the dance world. In 1947, Helen Tamiris invited him to take the dancing role of Wild Horse in the national company of Annie Get Your Gun, starring Mary Martin. It proved to be a popular role that he would repeat in other productions, touring it as far afield as South Africa, where, in Johannesburg, he also danced the featured role of Dream Curley in a 1950 production of Oklahoma!, with choreography by Agnes de Mille. Returning to New York, he found work on Broadway in the dancing ensemble of Out of This World (1950–1951), staged by de Mille and choreographed by Hanya Holm. This was followed by The Golden Apple (1954) and My Fair Lady (1956–1962), both choreographed by Holm, and Lady in the Dark (1963), a college production in Eugene, Oregon.

In later life, Mumaw focused on preserving the history and dances of Ted Shawn. He staged Shawn's choreography at workshops throughout the country, notably setting Kinetic Molpai for the Alvin Ailey American Dance Theater in 1972, and he supervised revivals of numerous Shawn works at Jacob's Pillow. He can be seen teaching Pierrot in the Dead City (1935) and reminiscing about his years at the Pillow in The Men Who Danced: The Story of Ted Shawn's Men Dancers and the Birth of Jacob's Pillow, 1933-1940, a 1989 documentary film directed by Ron Honsa.

Throughout his life, Mumaw remained fondly attached to the state of Florida, where he had grown up and to which he periodically returned to visit his family. In 1953 he staged Florida Aflame, a historical pageant about the Seminole Indian wars, in Lake Wales, and in 1977 he staged Royal Hunt of the Sun, a pageant celebrating the fiftieth anniversary of the founding of a college in St. Petersburg. In both productions he appeared as a solo dancer. He spent his last years at his home in Clearwater, where he died in 2001 at 88.

== Selected repertory ==
- 1933: Gnossienne: A Priest of Knossos (music, Satie; chor., Shawn)
- 1933: The French Sailor (music, Milhaud; chor., Shawn)
- 1933: Fetish (music, Meeker; chor., Mumaw)
- 1933: Cutting the Sugar Cane (music, Lecuona; chor., Shawn)
- 1934: Dyak Spear Dance (music, Meeker; chor., Mumaw)
- 1935: Kinetic Molpai (music, Meeker; chor., Shawn)
- 1935: Pierrot in the Dead City (music, Korngold; chor., Shawn)
- 1935: The Banner Bearer (music, Meeker; chor., Mumaw)
- 1939: Bourrée (music, Bach; chor., Mumaw)
- 1939: The God of Lightning (music, Bartók; chor., Mumaw)
- 1940: Funerailles: War and the Artist (music, Liszt; chor., Mumaw)
- 1941: Sonata (music, Scarlatti; chor., Mumaw)
- 1942: Osage-Pawnee Dance of Greeting (music, Grunn; chor., Shawn)
- 1946: Wild Horse (music, Berlin; chor., Tamiris)
- 1972: Mevlevi Dervish (music, Fuleihan; chor., Shawn)
- 1972: The Divine Idiot (music, Scriabin; chor., Shawn)
- 1975: I'll Make Me a World (music, Debussy; chor., Mumaw)
- 1981: O Brother Sun and Sister Moon (music, Respighi; chor., Shawn)
