= Judith Rascoe =

American screenwriter

- Born: April 17, 1941 (age 84); San Francisco, California, USA
- Education: Stanford University; University of Bristol; Harvard University
- Occupation: Screenwriter

Judith Rascoe (born April 17, 1941) is an American screenwriter known for films like Havana, Who'll Stop the Rain, and Road Movie.

She attended Stanford University, spent a year as a Fulbright scholar at the University of Bristol, studied at Harvard for a time, and soon after began publishing short stories.

She later worked as a journalist and as a teacher of fiction at Yale before turning to screenwriting almost by accident. Independent director Joe Strick came across one of her stories in The Atlantic and asked her if she'd like to write a script. That offer turned into her 1973 debut, Road Movie.

In 1973, she also published a book of short stories called Yours, and Mine.

== Selected filmography ==
- Road Movie (1973)
- Lifespan (1975)
- A Portrait of the Artist as a Young Man (1977)
- Who'll Stop the Rain (1978)
- Endless Love (1981)
- Eat a Bowl of Tea (1989)
- Havana (1990)
