= Earle Brown =

American composer (1926–2002)

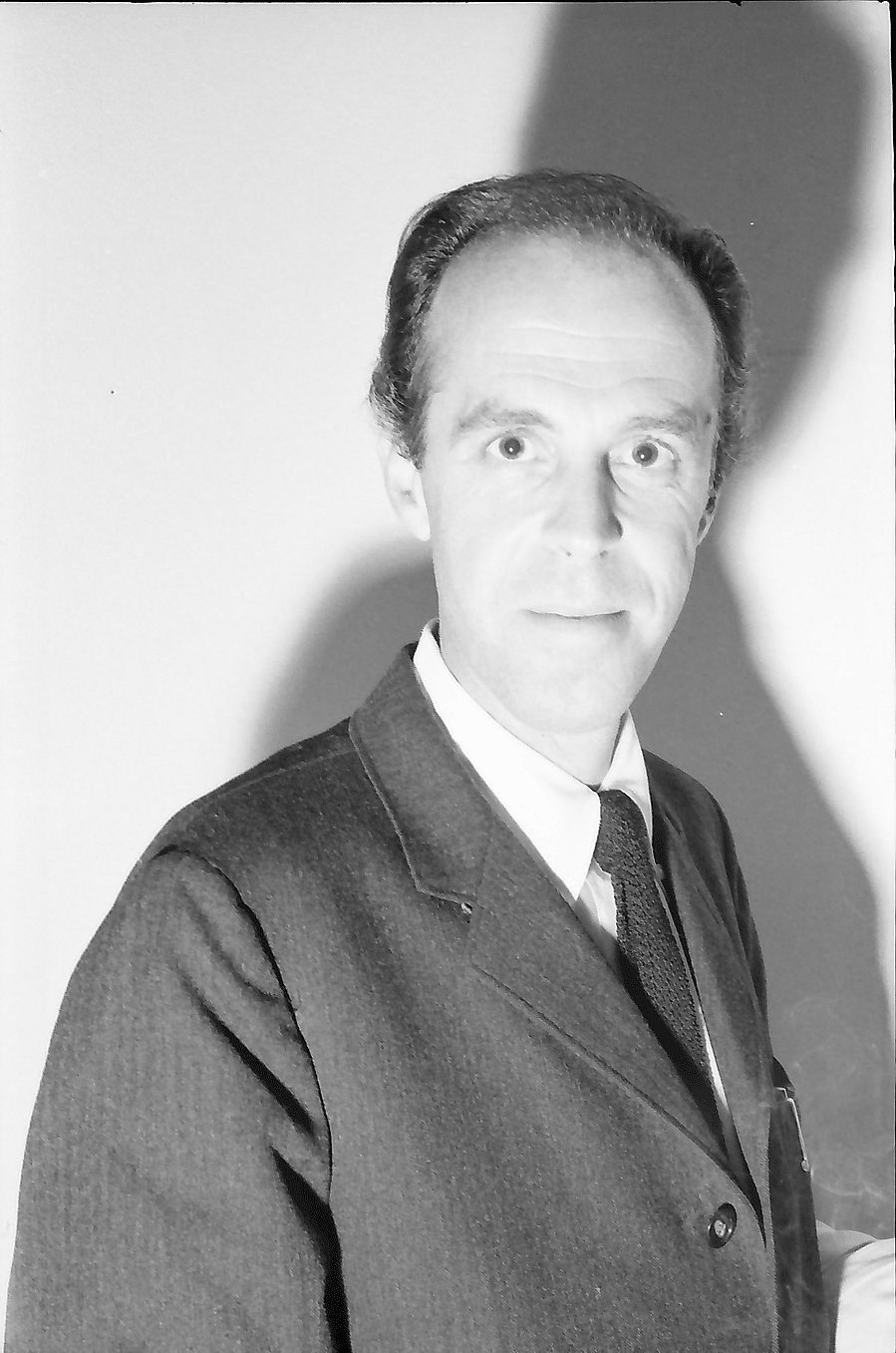
- Earle Brown in 1965
- Born: Earle Appleton Brown; December 26, 1926; Lunenburg, Massachusetts
- Died: He died on July 2, 2002, of cancer, at his home in Nyack, New York. Rye, New York
- Occupations: music composer, producer, and educator
- Years active: ca. 1949-1999
- Known for: FOLIO; December 1952; Available Forms I & II; Centering; Cross Sections and Color Fields
- Spouse(s): Carolyn Brown; Susan Sollins

Earle Brown (December 26, 1926 – July 2, 2002) was an American music composer, producer, and educator who, as a composer, was a close associate of John Cage, and established his own formal and notational systems. As such, he created "open form," a style of musical construction that influenced composers like John Zorn and the downtown New York scene of the 1980s, as well as later generations of composers.

Among Brown's most famous works are December 1952, an entirely graphic score, and the open form pieces Available Forms I & II, Centering, Cross Sections and Color Fields. He was awarded a Foundation for Contemporary Arts John Cage Award in 1998.

== Early life and education ==
Earle Appleton Brown was born on December 26, 1926 in Lunenburg, Massachusetts, and first devoted himself to playing jazz. He initially considered an engineering career and enrolled in engineering and mathematics at Northeastern University (1944–45). He enlisted in the U.S. Air Force in 1945. However, the war ended while he was still in basic training, and he was assigned to the base band at Randolph Field, Texas, where he played trumpet. The band included saxophonist Zoot Sims. Between 1946 and 1950, he was a student at Schillinger House in Boston, now the Berklee College of Music. At the same time, Brown had private instruction in trumpet and composition.

== Career ==
After graduating, he moved to Denver to teach Schillinger techniques. John Cage invited Brown to leave Denver and join him for the Project for Music for Magnetic Tape in New York. Brown was an editor and recording engineer for Capitol Records (1955–60) and producer for Time-Mainstream Records (1960–73).

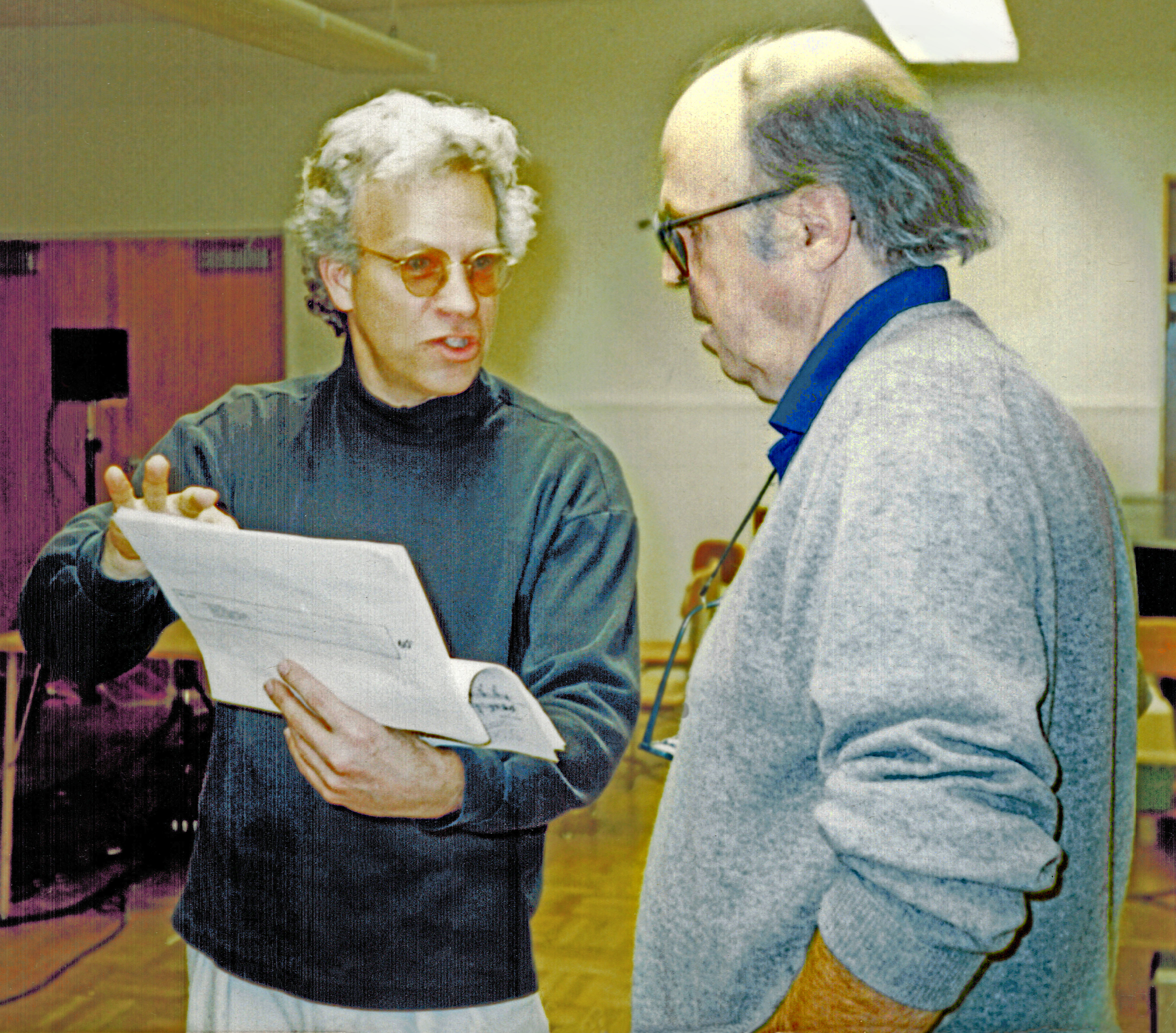
Earle Brown (right) with pianist David Arden, August 1995

Brown's contact with Cage exposed David Tudor to some of Brown's early piano works, and this connection led to Brown's work being performed in Darmstadt and Donaueschingen. Composers such as Pierre Boulez and Bruno Maderna promoted his music, which subsequently became more widely performed and published.

Brown is considered a member of the New York School of composers, along with John Cage, Morton Feldman, and Christian Wolff. Brown cited the visual artists Alexander Calder and Jackson Pollock as two primary influences on his work. Author Gertrude Stein and many artists also inspired him he was acquainted with, such as Max Ernst and Robert Rauschenberg.

Brown's notable students included Joe Jones, Paul Dresher, Michael Daugherty, Sarah Meneely Kyder, and George Brunner.

== Formal and notational systems ==
=== Open form ===
Brown created the notational concept called "open form". It was a style of musical construction that has influenced many composers since, notably see John Zorn and the downtown New York scene of the 1980s, as well as generations of younger composers.

Much of Brown's work is composed in fixed modules (though often with idiosyncratic mixtures of notation), but the order is left free to be chosen by the conductor during performance. The material is divided into numbered "events" on a series of "pages". The conductor uses a placard to indicate the page, and his left hand indicates which event is to be performed while his right hand cues a downbeat to begin. The speed and intensity of the downbeat suggest the tempo and dynamics.

Brown's first open-form piece, Twenty-Five Pages, was 25 unbound pages and called for anywhere between one and 25 pianists. The score allowed the performer(s) to arrange the pages however they saw fit. Also, the pages were notated symmetrically and without clefs, so the top and bottom orientations were reversible.

Through this procedure, no two performances of an open form Brown score will be the same, yet each piece retains a singular identity, and his works exhibit great variety from work to work. Brown relates his work in open form to a combination of Alexander Calder's mobile sculptures and the spontaneous decision-making used in the creation of Jackson Pollock's action paintings.

=== Notation ===
Although Brown precisely notated compositions throughout his career using traditional notation, he also was an inventor and early practitioner of various innovative notations.

In Twenty-Five Pages and other works, Brown used what he called "time notation," or "proportional notation," where rhythms were indicated by their horizontal length and placement about each other and were to be interpreted flexibly. However, in Modules I and II (1966), Brown used stemless note heads more often, which could be interpreted with even greater flexibility.

In 1959, with Hodograph I, Brown sketched the contour and character abstractly in what he called the piece's "implications." This graphic style was more gestural and calligraphic than the geometric abstraction of December 1952. Beginning with Available Forms I, Brown used this graphic notation on the staff in some score sections.

== Major works ==
Among his most famous works are December 1952, an entirely graphic score, and the open form pieces Available Forms I & II, Centering, Cross Sections and Color Fields.

=== December 1952 and FOLIO ===
December 1952 is perhaps Brown's most famous score. It is part of a larger set of unconventionally-notated music called FOLIO. Brown considered such a set to have "both success and failure". Brown studied what is now called Early Music, which had its own notation system; he was a student of the Schillinger System, which almost exclusively used graph methods for describing music. From this perspective, FOLIO was an inspired, yet logical, connection to be made, especially for a Northeasterner who grew up playing and improvising jazz.

December 1952 consists purely of horizontal and vertical lines varying in width, spread out over the page; it is a landmark piece in the history of graphic notation of music. The performer interprets the score visually and translates the graphical information into music. In Brown's notes on the work, he even suggests that one consider this 2D space as 3D and imagine moving through it. The other pieces in the collection are not as abstract.

== Awards and recognition ==
Brown was awarded a Foundation for Contemporary Arts John Cage Award in 1998.

== Selected further works ==
- Home Burial (1949), for piano.
- Three Pieces for Piano (1951).
- Music for Violin, Cello & Piano (1952).
- Perspectives (1952), for piano.
- Twenty-Five Pages (1953), for 1–25 pianos.
- Octet I (1953), for eight magnetic tapes and eight loudspeakers.
- Indices (1954), for chamber orchestra.
- Forgotten Piece (1954), for piano.
- Folio and 4 Systems (1954), for variable instrumentation.
- Indices [Piano Reduction] (1954).
- Octet II (1954), for eight magnetic tapes and eight loudspeakers.
- Music for Cello and Piano (1955).
- Four More (1956), for piano.
- The Kind of Bird I Am (1957), for orchestra.
- Pentathis (1958), for chamber ensemble.
- Hodograph I (1959), for chamber ensemble.
- Available Forms I (1961), for chamber orchestra.
- Available Forms II (1962), for two orchestras.
- Novara (1962), for chamber ensemble.
- From Here (1963), for chamber orchestra.
- Times Five (1963), for chamber ensemble.
- Corroboree (1964), for three or two pianos.
- Nine Rarebits (1965), for one or two harpsichords.
- String Quartet (1965).
- Calder Piece (1966), for four percussionists and mobile.
- Module I (1966), for orchestra.
- Module II (1966), for orchestra.
- Event: Synergy II (1967), for chamber ensemble
- Module III (1969), for orchestra.
- Small Pieces for Large Chorus (1969).
- Syntagm III (1970), for chamber ensemble.
- New Piece (1971), for variable instrumentation.
- New Piece Loops (1972), for orchestra and chorus.
- Sign Sounds (1972), for chamber orchestra.
- Time Spans (1972), for orchestra.
- Centering (1973), for solo violin and ensemble.
- Cross Sections and Color Fields (1975), for orchestra.
- Wikiup (1979), sound installation for six independent playing devices.
- Windsor Jambs (1980), for chamber ensemble.
- Folio II (1982), for variable instrumentation.
- Sounder Rounds (1983), for orchestra.
- Tracer (1985), for chamber ensemble.
- Oh, K (1992), for chamber ensemble.
- Tracking Pierrot (1992), for chamber ensemble.
- Summer Suite '95 (1995), for piano.
- Special Events (1999), for chamber ensemble.

== Selected discography ==
- The New York School (includes compositions by John Cage, Morton Feldman, Christian Wolff), hatART, 1993.
- The New York School 2 (includes compositions by John Cage, Morton Feldman, Christian Wolff), hatART, 1995.
- Four Systems, hatART, 1995 (with Eberhard Blum, flutist).
- Synergy, hatART, 1995 (with Ensemble Avantgarde).
- Earle Brown: Music for Piano(s), 1951–1995, New Albion, 1996 (with David Arden, pianist; John Yaffé, producer).
- Brown: Centering: Windsor Jambs; Tracking Pierrot; Event: Synergy II, Newport, 1998.
- American Masters Series: Earle Brown, CRI, 2000.
- Earle Brown: Selected Works 1952–1965, 2006.
- Folio and Four Systems, 2006.
- Earle Brown: Chamber Works, 2007 (DVD).
- Earle Brown: Tracer, 2007.
- Wergo Contemporary Sound Series, recorded from 1960–1973: Earle Brown – A Life in Music (3 CDs each).

== Personal life ==
Brown was married to the dancer Carolyn Brown, who danced with Merce Cunningham (from the 1950s to the 1970s), and then to the art curator Susan Sollins. He died on July 2, 2002 from cancer, in Rye, New York.
