= John Christian (dancer) =

American dancer (1921–1982)

- Born: John Christian Ammann; February 22, 1921; Riverhead, New York
- Died: April 26, 1982 (aged 61); Eustis, Florida
- Occupation: Dancer

John Christian Ammann, known as John Christian, (February 22, 1921 – April 26, 1982) was an American dancer, actor, dance educator, artistic director, and set and costume designer. For several years he was director of the Jacob's Pillow Dance Festival and its associated school. A gay man, he was the domestic partner of Ted Shawn, the founder of Jacob's Pillow. His papers and other items are held in the Special & Area Studies Collection of the George A. Smathers Libraries at the University of Florida.

== Life and career ==
The son of Matthias and Helen Ammann, John Christian Ammann was born in Riverhead, New York on February 22, 1921. He started his career as a set and costume designer in his early 20s.

Christian began a relationship with the dancer Barton Mumaw. Mumaw was then in a relationship with Ted Shawn, and had an affair with Christian while Shawn was away in Australia in 1946–1947. When Shawn returned Mumaw broke off his relationship with Shawn after informing him he was in love with Christian. Not long after, Shawn invited Christian to work at Jacob's Pillow; an invitation which Mumaw interpreted as an olive branch to him and Christian. Not long after, Christian and Shawn began their own affair, and Christian ended his relationship with Mumaw. Shawn and Christian were domestic partners from 1949 until Shawn's death in 1972.

As Shawn's health declined in 1966, Christian became increasingly more involved in leading Jacob's Pillow which Shawn had founded. In 1967 he was appointed executive director of Jacob's Pillow by the governing board and assumed primary leadership responsibilities over the organization while Shawn maintained the title of founding and artistic director. Mumaw was brought in to assist with the leadership transition and to take on several artistic tasks that Shawn was no longer able to do because of his health issues. Christian spearheaded and oversaw the filming of a 1969 television documentary on Jacob's Pillow that was made by the Corporation for Public Broadcasting. He continued to serve as director of Jacob's Pillow after Shawn's death in 1972.

On April 26, 1982, Christian died in Eustis, Florida.
