= Veronica's Room =

Play by Ira Levin

- First publication (1974)
- Written by: Ira Levin
- Setting: Walpole, Massachusetts

Premiere
- Date: October 25, 1973
- Place: Music Box Theatre

Veronica's Room is a theatrical play by Ira Levin (the author best known for Rosemary's Baby and The Stepford Wives), which was originally mounted in 1973. Because identifying the characters by name would spoil the plot of the play for audience members, printed programs normally identify the four characters as Woman, Man, Girl, and Young Man, which are also the names used for them in the script.

== Plot ==
A middle-aged Irish couple, John and Maureen Mackey, bring a young couple, Susan and Larry, to the suburban Boston home where the Mackeys are caretakers. Susan and Larry have recently begun to date, and the Mackeys approached them at a restaurant due to Susan's resemblance to a dead woman, Veronica. The Mackeys explain that Veronica's elderly, senile sister, Cissie, is now their charge, and Susan agrees to dress up as Veronica in an effort to bring Cissie a sense of closure. The year is 1973, but Cissie believes it to be 1935. Larry and the Mackeys leave Susan alone in Veronica's preserved bedroom to change into a period outfit.

The older couple return with completely different appearances and personalities; they appear about twenty years younger and now have Boston accents. They treat the young woman as if she were Veronica, and they represent themselves as her parents, Lloyd and Nedra. They accuse her of having murdered Cissie after Cissie discovered (and threatened to reveal) Veronica's incestuous relationship with their younger brother, Conrad. They also maintain that it is 1935. When the young woman stands by her identity as Susan from 1973, Lloyd and Nedra regard her as insane and call for the family physician, Dr. Simpson. When he arrives, the young woman recognises him as Larry. The young woman is ultimately broken; she acknowledges that she is Veronica and she confesses to Veronica's misdeeds. Nedra then leads the others in murdering her.

It is revealed that the older man and woman are in fact Veronica and Conrad, while the younger man is their son, "Boy." This is not the first time the three have carried out such a murder, nor will it be the last; Boy brings Veronica and Conrad young women who resemble Veronica, so that Veronica can experience murdering herself as a catharsis. They give the bodies to Boy, a necrophiliac, to do with as he wishes. Veronica is left alone in her room.

== Development ==
In a 1973 interview with the New York Daily News, Levin said "I had given up writing plays, but I got an idea for this one and right away I started working it out. It almost wrote itself. I just kept at it and at it, and finally finished it one Tuesday morning last winter. I sent it to my agent and he sent it to Morton Gottlieb, our first choice as producer, and within 48 hours, he optioned it. That's when it all began falling into place."

"Eileen Heckart called the day after she got the script and agreed to do it. Arthur Kennedy took two days, but he was up in Nova Scotia, or thereabouts. Then we got the theater we wanted and the set designer we wanted."

== Productions ==
Veronica's Room debuted on October 1, 1973, at the Colonial Theatre in Boston, Massachusetts. It was performed for three weeks from October 1 to October 20, to "break-in" the show prior to transferring to the Broadway.

In the original Broadway production directed by Ellis Rabb in 1973, Eileen Heckart played the Woman, Arthur Kennedy played the Man, Regina Baff played the Girl, and Kipp Osborne played the Young Man. Set design was done by Douglas W. Schmidt, assisted by John Lee Beatty, and won a Drama Desk Award for Outstanding Set Design. Nancy Marchand and Sydney Walker acted as standbys for Heckart and Kennedy.

An Off-Broadway revival opened at the Provincetown Playhouse on March 8, 1981, and ran for 97 performances. The production was directed by Arthur Savage and was performed by Georgine Hall (The Woman), Innes-Fergus McDade (The Girl), John Milligan (The Man) and Claude-Albert Saucier (The Young Man). For this revival, the placement of the intermission was moved up slightly from its original placement to add greater suspense.

== Characters and cast members ==
Characters	Broadway	Off-Broadway revival
Characters	1973	1981
The Woman	Eileen Heckart	Georgine Hall
The Man	Arthur Kennedy	John Milligan
The Girl	Regina Baff	Innes-Fergus McDade
Young Man	Kipp Osborne	Claude-Albert Saucier

== Reception ==
Veronica's Room received mixed to negative reviews from critics upon its opening. After its October 1, 1973, opening in Boston, journalist Kevin Kelly from The Boston Globe criticized the plot, and pacing. He goes on to point out that, "...the name Mr. Levin has given [Susan] is phonetically close... to the name of a coed recently murdered, a coincidence he should eliminate."

Rex Reed of the New York Daily News called the show, "...a demented charade passing itself off as a psychological thriller." New York Times reporter Clive Barnes was of the opinion, "The play is strong on atmosphere and totally weak in reality. It shouts a lot but means little." Richard Watts of the New York Post, called the show, "too mysterious for its own good."

Douglas Watt of the New York Daily News, though being critical of Levin's plot, applauded many other aspects of the production, stating, "...the dialogue is crisp and the acting and direction are smart, indeed." Of the technical aspects he said, "Douglas W. Schmidt's towering and richly appointed three-cornered set, Nancy Potts' costumes and John Gleason's lighting all marvelously set the tone for an evening of mystery." He continued to say, "Miss Heckart and Arthur Kennedy as her fellow conspirator are first-rate, and Kipp Osborne is interesting as the string-bean boy friend."

== Awards and nominations ==
=== Original Broadway production ===
Year	Award Ceremony	Category	Nominee	Result
1974	Drama Desk Award	Outstanding Set Design	Douglas W. Schmidt; John Lee Beatty	Won
1974	Tony Awards	Best Featured Actress in a Play	Regina Baff	Nominated
