= Road Movie (1973 film) =

Drama film by Joseph Strick

- Theatrical poster
- Directed by: Joseph Strick
- Written by: Judith Rascoe; Joseph Strick
- Produced by: Joseph Strick
- Starring: Robert Drivas; Regina Baff; Barry Bostwick; David Bauer
- Cinematography: Don Lenzer
- Edited by: Sylvia Sarner
- Music by: Stanley Myers
- Production company: Laser Film Productions
- Distributed by: Grove Press
- Release date: December 1973
- Running time: 88 minutes
- Country: United States
- Language: English

Road Movie is a 1973 road movie drama film produced and directed by Joseph Strick, who also co-wrote the screenplay with Judith Rascoe. It stars Robert Drivas, Regina Baff, Barry Bostwick, and David Bauer.

The film is based on Strick's experiences one summer, working as a long-haul truck driver.

== Plot summary ==
A pair of truckers, Gil and Hank, pick up Janice, a hitchhiking truck stop prostitute (a.k.a. "lot lizard"), who brings more chaos into their lives.

== Cast ==
- Robert Drivas as Gil
- Regina Baff as Janice
- Barry Bostwick as Hank
- David Bauer as Harry

== Release ==
The film initially premiered in Italy in December 1973. It was later released in the United States on February 3, 1974.

== Reception ==
Jessica Kiang of BFI's Sight and Sound called the film "a fascinating curio, as willfully ugly in its portrayal of the joyless industrial landscapes of the mid-70s Midwest as it is nihilistic about the grasping relationships between its three leads".
