= Robert Blue =

Robert Dunlap Blue (1946 – January 22, 1998) was a painter noted for his images of pin-up girls in the 1980s and later his cowgirls of the New West series. He was the son of comedic actor Ben Blue. Blue's work precedes that of Patrick Nagel, as Blue's credits as a commercial artist date as early as 1970. A Blue painting was used for the album back cover art for Iron Butterfly "Metamorphosis" 1970 LP release and he painted fetish pin-ups of icon Bettie Page on canvas as early as 1974, which were collected by the "Pin-up King" Charles G. Martignette. (Martignette is co-author of The Great American Pin-Up with Louis K. Meisel). Other notable collectors of Blue's art have included Jack Nicholson, Barbra Streisand, Brian Wilson and Hugh Hefner, as well as numerous corporate collectors, including the Hyatt Regency Hotel in Los Angeles, and the Atlanta Hilton Motel. Blue's paintings are in the National Archives in Washington D.C. and the permanent collection of the Carnegie Art Museum.

== Biography ==
Robert Dunlap Blue was born, 27 August 1946 in Los Angeles County, California, to Axie (née Dunlap) and Ben Blue, and grew up in Beverly Hills. He served in the United States Army and attended the California College of Arts and Crafts, Oakland, earning a BFA at the Chouinard Art Institute (1969) in Los Angeles. Blue served as chairman of fine art at Assn. in Art, Van Nuys.

In 1979, Blue joined Brian Davis to form the Davis-Blue Artwork publishing company. This company published a number of dramatic posters, including some by illustrator Major Felten.

Blue, a published painter as early as 1970 worked in many mediums including watercolors, oils and acrylics. Blue's fashion pin-up "Blue Girl" paintings and serigraphs were done in the 1980s, selling to Japan. Compare Blue's artwork to the famous Playboy and commercial illustrator Patrick Nagel, both artists were alumni of the Chouinard Art Institute and painted women during the 1980s.

Blue's popular 1980s period "Blue Girl" series was easily identifiable. Blue painted eyebrows featuring a signature zig-zag detail, with hair swirls with individual strands (often in a stark violet or gold), hands adorning long painted nails, frequently in cherry red. Some popular paintings include "Monica," "Lauren," "Claudia," and golden-haired "Suzanne," in which Blue painted and printed his female subject's hair strands in micronized 24k gold.

In the early 1990s, Blue painted with more realism. By the mid 1990s Blue began painting Bettie Page. Blue and Page collaborated on a series of serigraphs which Page also signed. Robert Blue, Dave Stevens and Olivia De Berardinis feature Page.

Blue succumbed to brain cancer in Santa Monica in 1998, and the Robert Blue Foundation to aid brain cancer victims was instituted in his memory. He was survived by his wife, Linda, and his brother, Tom.

Blue's art was featured in the 1974 film The Second Coming of Suzanne, and also 1984's Heartbreakers, which was loosely based on Blue himself. His work also appeared in the 1982 Richard Elfman film Forbidden Zone.
