= John C. Becher =

American actor (1915–1986)

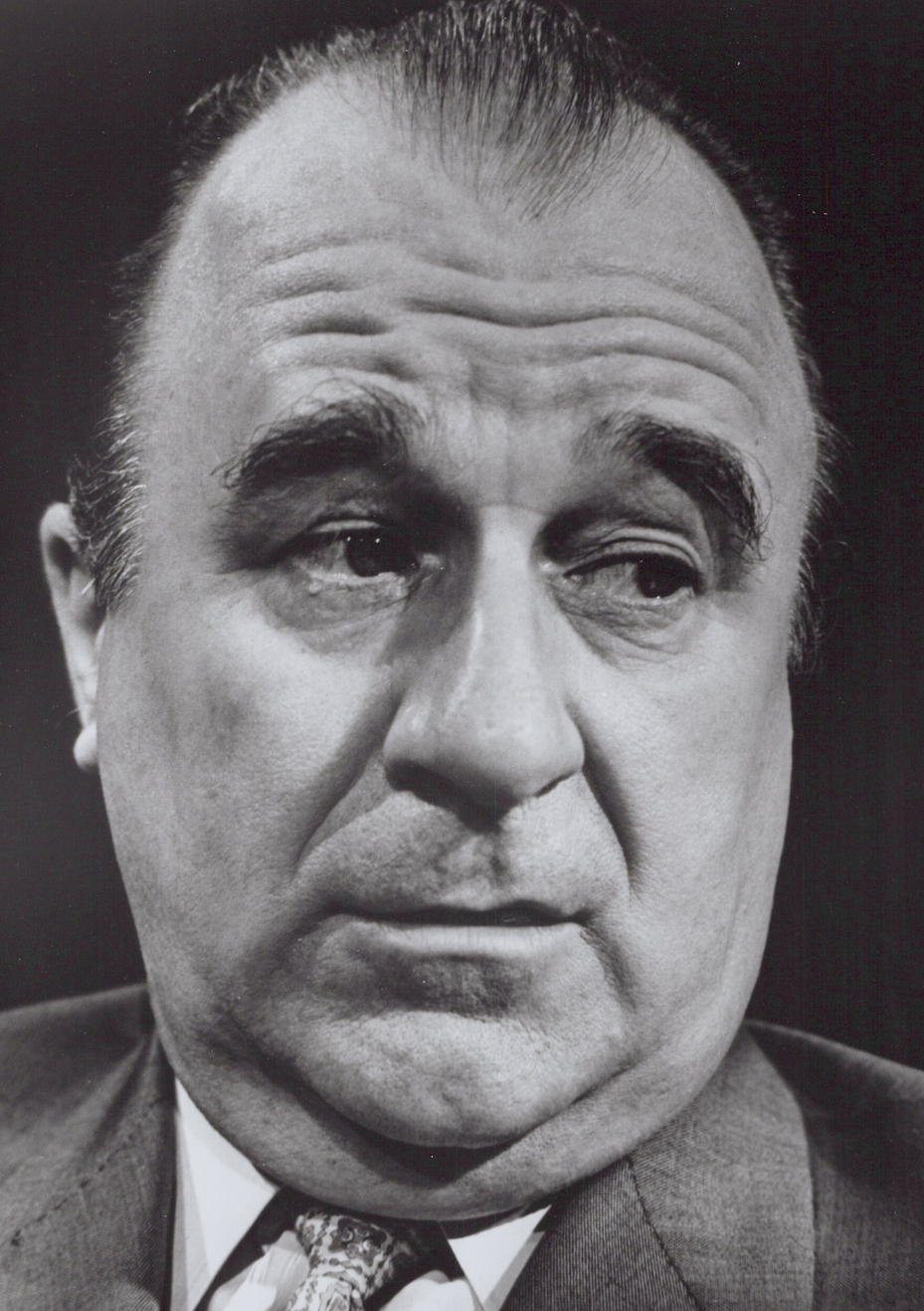
- Becher in 1969
- Born: 15 January 1915; Milwaukee, Wisconsin
- Died: 20 September 1986 (age 71)

John C. Becher (15 January 1915 – 20 September 1986) was an American stage and television actor. He made his professional debut in 1946 at the McCarter Theatre.

== Early life and education ==
Becher was born on 15 January 1915 in Milwaukee, Wisconsin, to parents John and Katherine. In 1938, he obtained his Bachelor of Science degree from Milwaukee State Teachers College. Three years later he obtained his Bachelor of Fine Arts degree from the Goodman School of Drama in Chicago.

== Career ==
Becher made his first professional appearance on 20 September 1946 playing the role of Lord Sands in a production of Henry VIII by the American Repertory Theatre company at the McCarter Theatre in Princeton, New Jersey. He stayed with the company for their 1946–1947 season, playing such roles as the Lion in Androcles and the Lion and the Queen of Hearts in Alice in Wonderland. In 1966, Becher played Mr. Upson in the original Broadway theatre production of Mame at the Winter Garden Theatre. He returned to the role in the 1983 Broadway revival at the Gershwin Theatre. Becher appeared in various other original Broadway productions, including those of Skipper Next to God in 1948, The Ballad of the Sad Cafe in 1963, and the short-lived Status Quo Vadis in 1973. He also had a successful television career, appearing on such shows as The Life and Legend of Wyatt Earp in 1958, The Defenders in 1965, and Taxi in 1979.

== Death ==
Becher died of cancer at the age of 71 on 20 September 1986 at Hollywood Presbyterian Medical Center in Los Angeles.

== Partial filmography ==
- The Wrong Man (1956) - Liquor Store Proprietor (uncredited)
- The Odd Couple (1968) - Hotel Clerk (uncredited)
- Dirtymouth (1970) - Harry
- Up the Sandbox (1972) - Mr. Koerner
- Crazy Joe (1974) - (uncredited)
- Next Stop, Greenwich Village (1976) - Sid Weinberg - Casting Director
- The Great Bank Hoax (1978) - Alex Kaiser
- Below the Belt (1980) - Bobby Fox
- Honky Tonk Freeway (1981) - Brandon C. Dasher
- Little House on the Prairie (1981) - Mr. Golden
- Diff'rent Strokes (1982) - Jack Darcy
- Benson - Gov. Mulligan (1982), Stump (1983)
- Joanie Loves Chachi (1982) - Minister
- The Man Who Wasn't There (1983) - Cherub
- Gremlins (1984) - Dr. Molinaro
- Mass Appeal (1984) - Mr. Jennings
- ’’ Murder She Wrote’’ (1985) - Episode: “School for Scandal” - Station Manager
- Murphy's Romance (1985) - Jesse Parker
- Say Yes (1986) - Bride's Father (final film role)
- The Facts Of Life (Stake-Out Blues) (1986) - Everett
