= Below the Belt (1980 film) =

1980 American wrestling film

- DVD cover
- Directed by: Robert Fowler
- Written by: Robert Fowler; Sherry Sonnett
- Produced by: Robert Fowler; Joseph Miller
- Starring: Regina Baff; John C. Becher; Mildred Burke; Ric Mancini; James Gammon
- Cinematography: Alan Metzger; Misha Suslov
- Edited by: Steven Zaillian
- Music by: Jerry Fielding
- Production company: Aberdeen Productions
- Distributed by: Atlantic Releasing Corporation
- Release date: September 16, 1980
- Running time: 91 minutes
- Country: United States
- Language: English

Below the Belt is a 1980 American wrestling comedy film. Made in 1974, it was not released until 1980. It is loosely based on the novel To Smithereens by Rosalyn Drexler and tells the story of a New York City waitress who becomes a professional wrestler. Several real-life wrestlers were cast in the film, which was director Robert Fowler's first feature film.

On release the film carried an R MPA rating. It had a limited release outside the United States, receiving a 12 certificate in the United Kingdom.

== Plot ==
The film was inspired by the memoir To Smithereens by Rosalyn Drexler (who wrestled as the "Mexican Spitfire", the same as Rosa in the film).

Wrestling promoter Bobby Fox witnesses waitress Rosa Rubinsky forcefully fending off an unwanted sexual advance outside a restaurant in a New York sports arena. Fox suggests she become a pro wrestler.

After several months of part-time training at a local gym, Bobby Fox takes Rosa on the road with a group of other wrestlers, touring the Southern States. Rosa is still in training, and while she has doubts about the itinerant lifestyle, she perseveres, and bonds with the other wrestlers in the troop. Rosa, billed as Rosa Carlo "The Mexican Spitfire", ends her year-long apprenticeship with her first pro fight. It is in Birmingham, Alabama, against a well-established local favorite, Tommy “The Terrible”. After being booed on entering the ring, Rosa defeats Tommy, who accidentally knocks herself out. The crowd cheer and chant Rosa's name in appreciation. Leaving her doubts behind here, Rosa's wrestling career had begun.

== Cast ==
Several of the cast were professional wrestlers, with no background in acting, including Mildred Burke, a three-time women's world champion.

- Regina Baff as Rosa Rubinsky
- John C. Becher as Bobby Fox
- Mildred Burke as herself
- Ric Mancini as Tio
- James Gammon as Luke
- Annie McGreevey as The Beautiful Boomerang
- Jane O'Brien as Terrible Tommy
- Sierra Pecheur as Verne Vavoom
- Billie Mahoney as Jean
- Frazer Smith as Terry Glantz
- Shirley Stoler as Trish
- Dolph Sweet as LeRoi

== Release ==
Although made in 1974, the film was not released until 1980, first appearing in US cinemas on September 16, 1980.

== Reception ==
=== Critical response ===
The film received generally poor reviews, most reviewers finding the film enjoyable and authentic, but lacking in substance. Janet Maslin in the New York Times commented that the film "is appealing, but it is also on the aimless side, as it follows the evolution of Rosa Rubinsky, waitress, as she becomes Rosa Carlo, the Mexican Spitfire. ... Below the Belt does not treat any of these women as freaks, and it is not a voyeuristic effort. Mr. Fowler's direction captures an unexpected sweetness about these feisty characters, even if it lacks the forcefulness that could turn the film into something more than a curiosity. Regina Baff gives a spunky, if untutored, performance as Rosa, and her easygoing presence contributes a lot to the film's feeling of naturalness."

Dennis Schwartz on Dennis Schwartz Movie Reviews gave the film B−, describing it as “A feel-good lady wrestling road pic that’s ahead of its time. It’s enjoyable despite its slightness. There are lots of wrestling matches and colorful wrestlers, it captures the ups and downs of life on the road, and re-creates the seedy wrestling atmosphere. It goes out of its way to show how far from glamorous is the lifestyle, and tells us that most of the ladies are in the business for fame and fortune."

Time Out described it as a "cheapo independent precursor of Aldrich's California Dolls, adapting road movie clichés to the women's wrestling circuit, which lacks – if you'll excuse the expression – the balls of classic exploitation." An online review on filmfanatic.org observed that the film "contains plenty of authentic insights into the seamy world of low-rent wrestling, showing both the challenges and the bonds that occur along the way ... it all adds to the amiably paced flow of the film, which is more ethnographic than plot-driven."

The film scored 27% on Rotten Tomatoes, based on only one review.
