= Sue Barton =

Nurse, a character in novels for young girls

- Scholastic reprint
- Author: Helen Dore Boylston
- Cover artist: Major Felten
- Publisher: Little, Brown & Co.
- Published: 1936-1952
- Media type: Print

Sue Barton is the central character in a series of seven novels for adolescent girls written by Helen Dore Boylston between 1936 and 1952. The series was published by Little, Brown & Co. and saw a number of reprints following its initial publication. The series follows red-headed Sue Barton through her nurse's training and her career.

In a publisher's note in a 1967 British edition of the book, Boylston wrote that all the nursing incidents in the first two books were based on real events. The Kit, Connie and Bill characters were also based on real individuals and used their real names, while others used pseudonyms. She denied that Barton herself was an autobiographical portrait, saying "I made her up, lock, stock and barrel. She is the kind of person and the kind of nurse I wished I were, and I had a lot of fun creating her."

== Critical responses ==
The academic Deborah Philips has written that "Nursing is consistently constructed in the Sue Barton books as an appropriate means for a young woman to achieve some measure of financial independence and professional status and to contribute to the general good". Philips describes Boylston as having "a feminist edge" though noting that the books are silent on the subject of racism in nursing. Philips writes that the books "offer a radical intervention into contemporary debates about nursing and femininity in America, that derives from very marked feminist and radical origins".

Katherine Ashenburg notes the "current of worry that runs through the series, a to-and-fro rumination about a woman's difficulties in combining an independent life with marriage, a profession with a family".

== The series ==
In Sue Barton: Student Nurse, Sue begins training as a student nurse. She meets her friends, Canadian Katherine (Kit) Van Dyke and socialite Constance (Connie) Halliday, in this book, and her future husband, Dr. Bill Barry. Sue manages to have a number of adventures as she trains, including falling down a laundry shaft and saving a feverish patient from jumping out of a window while recovering from appendix surgery.

In Sue Barton: Senior Nurse, Sue finishes her training, which includes psychiatric nursing and obstetrics. She becomes engaged to Bill at the end of this book.

Sue Barton: Visiting Nurse follows Sue and her friend Kit as they venture to New York City to join the Henry Street Settlement Nurses, created by Lillian Wald. Their new home seems to be mysteriously haunted, but the very young and homeless street smart girl Marianna proves to be the reason. Connie gets married in this book and leaves her nursing career and Bill pressures Sue to marry him. Sue refuses, wanting a chance to repay the training she received from the Settlement Houses. Serving as visiting nurses, they are educating families on how to take care of the sick, teach them about hygiene and health as well as getting employment and financial aid as well. At one point, Sue helps an elderly patient fulfill her dream of travel by using the money meant for her own wedding wardrobe.

Sue Barton: Rural Nurse follows Sue as she leaves the Visiting Nurses and returns home, only to find that a tragic accident has left Bill with the care of his disabled brother Elliot. He cannot marry Sue until things are settled. Sue sets herself up as a visiting rural nurse in the town of Springdale, New Hampshire and winds up in the middle of a typhoid outbreak and a sudden dam accident. The funding of a local hospital gets underway.

Sue finally marries Bill at the start of Sue Barton: Superintendent Nurse and then works as the head of the nursing school at the new hospital in Springdale. However, her marriage to the new Senior Physician Bill is not smooth sailing and Sue questions her ability to provide a proper nursing training for her students. Marianna Lawson, an old acquaintance from her Henry Street time in New York City, poses many problems. In the very end of the book Sue hands in her resignation and tells Bill she is pregnant.

In Sue Barton: Neighborhood Nurse Sue suffers regrets about leaving her nursing career while she cares for her three children Tabitha and twin boys Johnny and Jerry, each of whom has particular needs. She also helps a young teenager, Cal, to be more sociable, and Cal's mother, the artist Mona Stuart, to be kinder. Sue realizes that her role in her family and the wider neighborhood is also important. Her old friend Kit Van Dyke is the new head of the nursing school.

In Sue Barton: Staff Nurse (the final installment in the series), Sue returns to work with the help of her loyal domestic help and friend Veazie Ann Cooney, to support her four children. Baby Sue is less than a year old, while her husband Dr. Bill Barry is in a sanatorium suffering from tuberculosis. He eventually recovers and the family is reunited, with the implication that Sue will return to her position as wife and mother.

== List of titles ==
1. Sue Barton: Student Nurse (1936)
2. Sue Barton: Senior Nurse (1937)
3. Sue Barton: Visiting Nurse (1938)
4. Sue Barton: Rural Nurse (1939)
5. Sue Barton: Superintendent of Nurses (1940)
6. Sue Barton: Neighborhood Nurse (1949)
7. Sue Barton: Staff Nurse (1952)
