= Marmein Dancers =

American vaudeville act and early proponent of avant garde dance

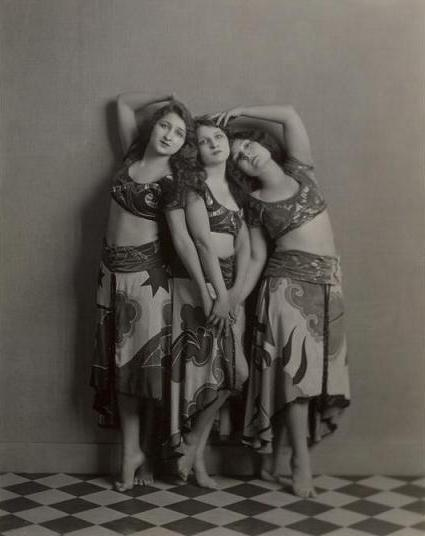
Miriam, Irene and Phyllis Marmein (ca.1920s) NYPL Digital Collection

The Marmein Dancers were an American vaudeville act and early proponent of avant garde dance performed by the sisters: Irene, Miriam and Phyllis Marmein.

== Early years ==
The Marmein Dancers were the daughters of Henry J. “Happy Jack” Marmein (1862-1930), a Chicago area real estate broker who later became an owner of the Gold Bug Mining Company of Arizona and Anna Engleton (1877-1949), in later years a well known lecturer and teacher of philosophy, drama, art, music and language.

Irene, the eldest, was born on February 4, 1894, in Peoria, Illinois. At the age of 15 she became the first schoolgirl to recite the Declaration of Independence during the annual Fourth of July celebration held at Boston's Faneuil Hall.

Miriam was born on July 28, 1897, sometime after the family moved to Chicago. Phyllis was born on July 4, 1908 in Boston. The youngest of the three, she joined the Marmein Dancers sometime in the early 1920s, around the time they were billed as ‘Presenting Drama – Dance - Grave and Gay’.

== Career ==
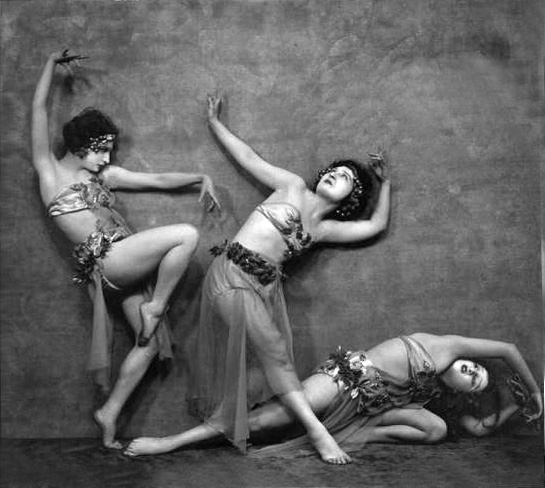
Marmein Dancers (ca.1920s) NYPL Digital Collection

Irene and Miriam may have started performing at an early age with the help of Maurice Brown, an English theatrical producer who founded the Chicago Little Theatre around 1912. The sister joined the vaudeville Orpheum circuit during the 1916-17 season, performing in venues throughout West from Texas to the Canadian Plains and westward along the Pacific Coast. In the early years, they would perform such dances as the Dance of the Gladiators to jazz and classical music provided by the Tennessee Ten Orchestra, and later pianist David Schooler, a one time child prodigy and future concert pianist and music director.

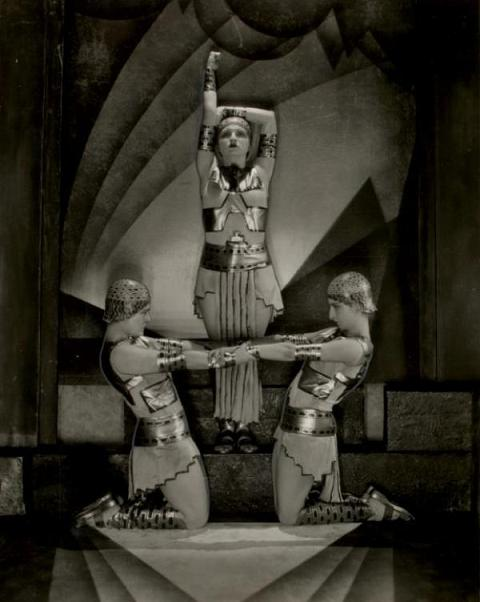
Marmein Dancers (ca.1920s) NYPL Digital Collection

An advertisement from that period billed their interpretive style dance and ballet pantomime called Production Classique, as ‘A Musical and Dancical Collaboration’ that was later changed to ‘A Revelation of Dance and Music’. Mother Anna Engleton Marmein was a driving force behind the group, and her portrait was included in a promotional flyer from 1926 with the caption "The Genius Behind the Marmein "Drama Dances". The sisters would go on to appear at Carnegie Hall in four separate performances (1924, 1926, 1927 and 1928), at which time they were billed as presenting "Their Original Pantomimes and Drama-Dances". They would later appear with the New York Symphony Orchestra under the baton of Walter Damrosch and other renowned orchestras of the time, including the New York Philharmonic.

The Marmein sisters continued to perform together well into the early 1930s until the sisters branched out to pursue separate careers. All three went on to dance, lecture, choreograph and teach.

=== Later years ===
Irene settled in Schenectady, New York, in the mid-1930s, where she directed numerous productions for the Schenectady Civic Players and the Schenectady Opera Company. She was also instrumental in establishing drama programs in nineteen state schools on behalf of the American Foundation of the Blind. Irene Marmein died after a prolonged illness on September 9, 1972, at Ellis Hospital in Schenectady.

Miriam would go on to operate dancing schools in Boston and later New York City, teaching a dance style she called Plasto-Rhythmic. Miriam was known as an accomplished costume designer and sketch artist and was active on the lecture circuit giving talks on dance and its allied arts. She performed at the Brooklyn Academy of Music in the late 1930s to early 40s, including a mixed bill program of pantomimes and dance-dramas. She died in mid August 1970 and was interred at the Oakwood Cemetery in Schenectady.

Phyllis later became director of the New School of Ballet in Schenectady and would continue to perform well into the 1950s. She died on June 23, 1994, at Schenectady. In 1990 she published her autobiography entitled, ‘Phyllis, a Dancer's Life’.
