= Helen Dore Boylston =

American novelist

- Born: April 4, 1895; Portsmouth, New Hampshire, United States
- Died: September 30, 1984 (aged 89); Trumbull, Connecticut, United States
- Occupations: Nurse, Writer
- Writing career
- Period: 1925–1955
- Genres: Memoir, Young Adult fiction and non-fiction
- Subjects: Nursing, Acting

Helen Dore Boylston (April 4, 1895 – September 30, 1984) was the American writer of the popular "Sue Barton" nurse series and "Carol Page" actor series.

== Biography ==
Born in Portsmouth, New Hampshire, Boylston spent her childhood there, and was nicknamed "Troub", short for Troubles. She attended Simmons College in Boston for a year. She thought of studying medicine like her father, but chose nursing since the training was shorter. She graduated as a nurse from Massachusetts General Hospital in 1915 and sailed for France to serve in the First World War with the Harvard Medical Unit, as part of the British Expeditionary Force.

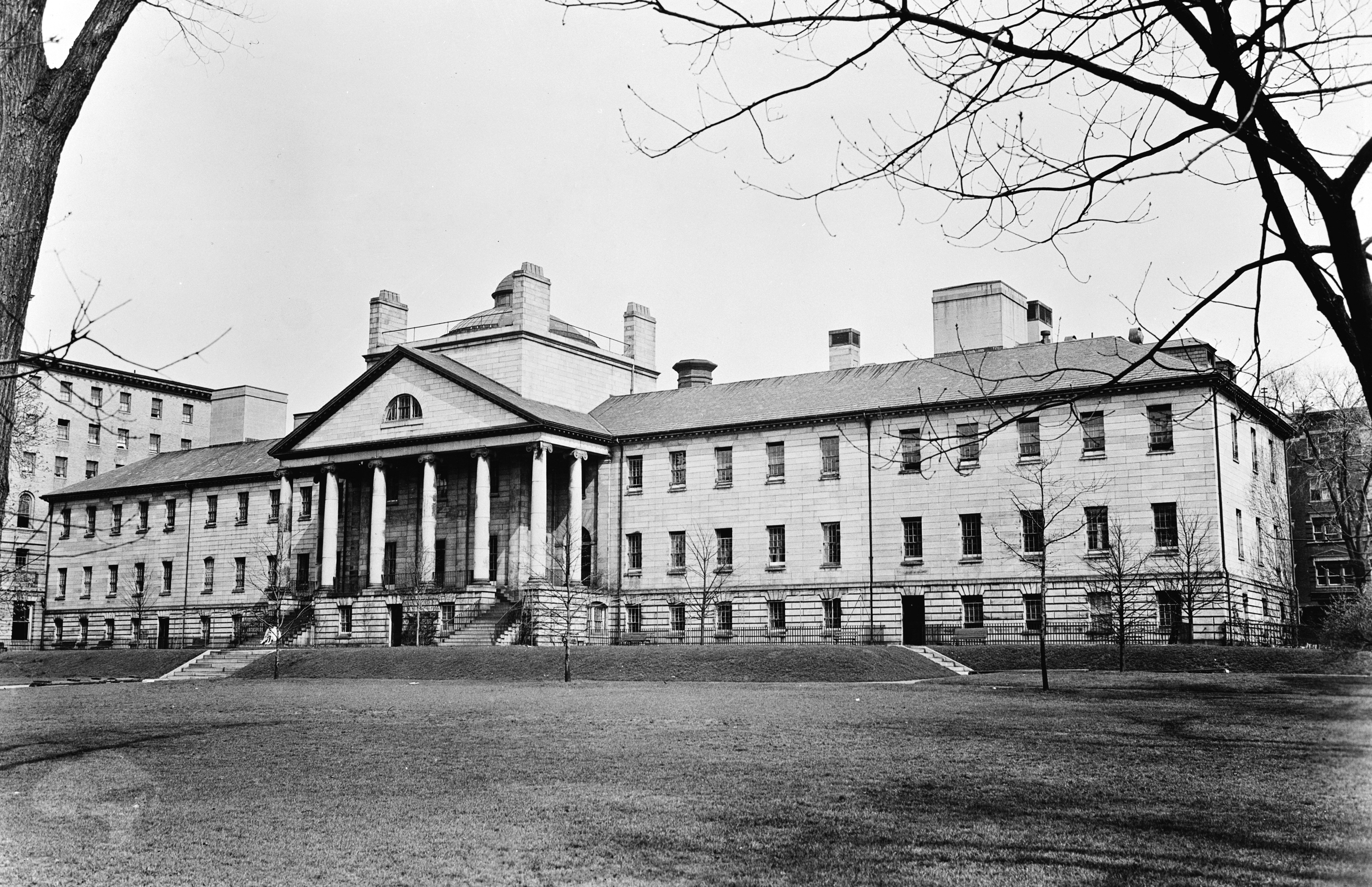
Massachusetts General Hospital

She nursed the wounded at a front-line field hospital, specializing as a nurse anesthetist and reaching the rank of captain. Boylston wrote about her experiences in Sister: The War Diary of a Nurse, which was published in 1920.

After the 1918 Armistice, Boylston remained in Europe working for the Red Cross for two years providing services to civilians in Albania, Poland, Russia, Italy, and Germany. Boylston met reporter Rose Wilder Lane, daughter of the not-yet-famous Laura Ingalls Wilder on a train between Paris and Warsaw. During periods in the United States, Boylston worked as the head of an outpatient department and as an instructor in anesthesiology at Massachusetts General Hospital, as well a psychiatric nurse in New York City and a head nurse in a Connecticut hospital, experiences she was to mine in future books. Between 1921 and 1924 she worked again with the Red Cross in Europe, and in 1925 wrote a reminiscence of her student nursing days that was published in the American Journal of Nursing.

Boylston was still anxious for adventure and wrote to a friend "Daddy wants me to settle down, but I'm young! I'm young! Why shouldn't I live? What is old age if it has no memories except of 40 years or so of blank days?" In 1926 Lane and Boylston traveled to Europe with the goal of moving to Albania and earning their living by writing. In preparation, between March and September 1926 they lived in Paris, studying French, Italian, German and Russian at the Berlitz School. In August they purchased a maroon Model T Ford which they named "Zenobia" in honor of the Bedouin queen of ancient times, and set off to Albania with their French maid, Yvonne. An account of the journey, called Travels With Zenobia: Paris to Albania by Model T Ford was published in 1983.

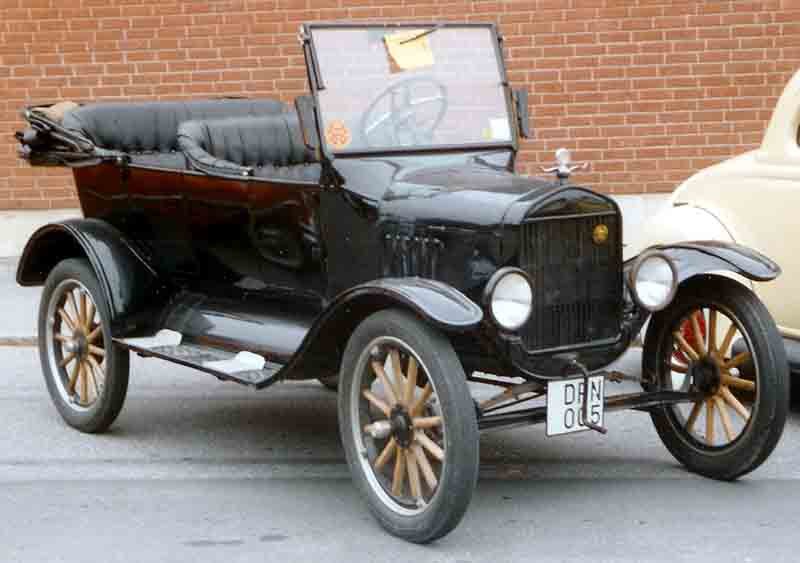
A Model T Ford

Boylston lived in a comfortable house in Tirana, Albania for two years. The house she shared with Lane was the scene of numerous parties, where members of the Albanian government danced to the sound of their imported Victrola. According to her publisher, Boylston "once made the Albanian Prime Minister carry her trunk off the boat and tried to tip him, not knowing who he was." She was also "shot at for two hours in a ditch in southern Albania, owing to a mistake in identity". While in Albania, Boylston assisted at an Albanian school of nursing that was directed by a fellow graduate from the School of Nursing at Massachusetts General Hospital. After about two years, Boylston saw a picture of a baked potato in a magazine, and feeling an "irresistible lure", returned to the US. A less dramatic version has her deciding to accompany Lane home after Lane had received a disturbing cablegram from her parents in January 1928.

In the summer of 1928 Boylston arrived at Rocky Ridge, the Wilder family farmhouse in Mansfield, Missouri. Encouraged by the publication of her War Diary in book form, she decided to gain a living by writing, though she also supported in part by inherited income. She initially lived in a tent on a hill near the farmhouse, though the plan was that Boylston and Lane would live in the remodeled and modernized farmhouse, while Lane's parents, Laura Ingalls Wilder and Almanzo Wilder, moved into a newly built English stone cottage.

Boylston lost considerable sums of investment income in the Depression and in the early 1930s moved east to work again as a nurse. In the late 1920s and early 1930s, Boylston began writing and publishing stories more seriously. She published articles and stories in The Atlantic Monthly, Harper's, and Argosy, and wrote a radio script for the Canadian Broadcasting Company. In 1936 Boylston published Sue Barton: Student Nurse, the first of her seven Sue Barton books. In publisher's note in a 1967 British edition of the book, Boylston stated that all the nursing incidents in the first two books were based on real events. The Kit, Connie and Bill characters were also based on real individuals and used their real names, while others used pseudonyms. She denied that Barton herself was an autobiographical portrait, saying "I made her up, lock, stock and barrel. She is the kind of person and the kind of nurse I wished I were, and I had a lot of fun creating her."

The books followed the career of a red-haired nurse as she progressed through her training, career, marriage and motherhood, and sought to maintain her independence. They were significant in providing role models to girls who wanted careers from the 1930s to 1950s, and in being among those that defined the young adult category of literature. The books were highly successful, selling millions of copies in English and translations, and were praised for their authentic representation of nursing practice and freedom from sentimentality. The books have been translated into several foreign languages, they remained in print ever since.

With Sue Barton married to Bill Barry and expecting her first baby in Sue Barton: Superintendent Nurse, Boylston began a new series about another career woman, this time an actress, Carol Page. She incorporated the advice and experience of Eva Le Gallienne, her friend and neighbor, as well as researching her stories backstage at La Gallienne's Civic Repertory Theatre in New York City. Boylston later returned to Sue Barton, publishing the final two books in the series Sue Barton: Neighborhood Nurse and Sue Barton: Staff Nurse in 1949 and 1952 respectively. In 1955, Boylston published Clara Barton: Founder of the American Red Cross, a biography for young adults of Civil War nurse Clara Barton.

Boylston never married. She suffered from dementia in later years, and died in Trumbull, Connecticut at the age of 89, leaving no known relatives.

== Works ==
- Sister: The War Diary of a Nurse (1920)
- Sue Barton, Student Nurse (1936)
- Sue Barton, Senior Nurse (1937)
- Sue Barton, Visiting Nurse (1938)
- Sue Barton, Rural Nurse (1939)
- Sue Barton, Superintendent of Nurses (1940)
- Sue Barton, Neighborhood Nurse (1949)
- Sue Barton, Staff Nurse (1952)
- Carol Goes Backstage (1941)
- Carol Plays Summer Stock (1942) (published as Carol in Repertory in the United Kingdom, 1944)
- Carol on Broadway (1944)
- Carol on Tour (1946)
- Clara Barton: Founder of American Red Cross (1955 and 1963)
- Travels With Zenobia: Paris to Albania by Model T Ford (with Rose Wilder Lane) (1983)

== Bibliography ==
- Holtz, William (1995). The Ghost in the Little House:A Life of Rose Wilder Lane. University of Missouri Press. ISBN 978-0-8262-1015-9.
