= Ella Baff =

American art director

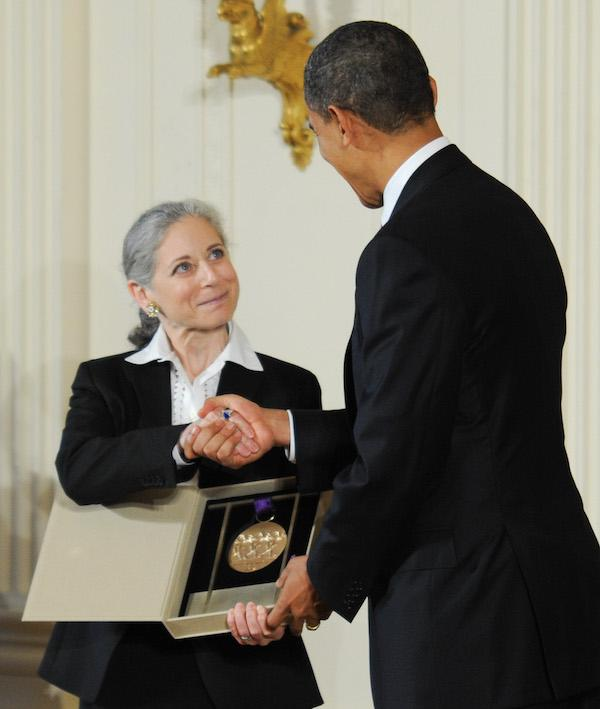
- Ella Baff accepting the National Medal of Arts from Barack Obama in 2011

Ella Baff was executive director of Jacob's Pillow from 1998 until 2015, where she was most known for her work as executive and artistic director of the annual Jacob's Pillow Dance Festival.

== Education ==
Baff was born in New York City and grew up on the Upper East Side. While in high school she took dance and also studied piano, violin, and harp. She began university at the University of New Mexico, where she studied modern dance and English literature. She received her undergraduate degree from the University of California, Berkeley in 1976. Following graduation she held multiple jobs including teaching in juvenile prisons and on an island in the Aleutian Islands.

== Career ==
Until 1997 Baff was the director of education and community programming at Cal Performances, an arts organization at the University of California, Berkeley. While there she was known for her work in programming contemporary and ethnic dance performances.

Starting in 1998, Baff was the executive and artistic director of Jacob's Pillow, a 225-acre historic site that encompasses an international dance festival, professional school, archives, exhibits, artist residencies, public venues, and education and community programs. Under her leadership, the organization was designated a National Historic Landmark. In her role of executive director, she traveled to international locations scouting talent for the dance festival. During Baff's time at Jacob's Pillow the group saw increased ticket sales and a new endowment campaign. The groups brought to the dance festival by Baff include the Martha Graham Dance Company and Madboots Dance, Sidi Larbi Cherkaoui, and Choreftes.

She also prioritized organizing the archives at Jacob's Pillow in order to make the information available to the public.

In 2015 Baff joined the Andrew W. Mellon Foundation as a senior program officer. Her role at the foundation centered on grants for performing arts and art history. She remained at the foundation until 2018.

== Honors and awards ==
In 2008 Baff received the Chevalier of the Order of Arts and Letters from the Ministry of Culture of France. She also received the Dawson Award for Programmatic Excellence from the Association of Performing Arts Professionals. She has received an honorary doctorate from the Massachusetts College of Liberal Arts in 2004. In 2015 she received an honorary degree from the College of the Holy Cross. In 2016 Baff was honored by Dance/USA at their annual conference.

In 2011 Baff accepted the National Medal of Arts from Barack Obama on behalf of the Jacob's Pillow Dance Festival.
