= Ted Shawn =

American dancer (1891–1972)

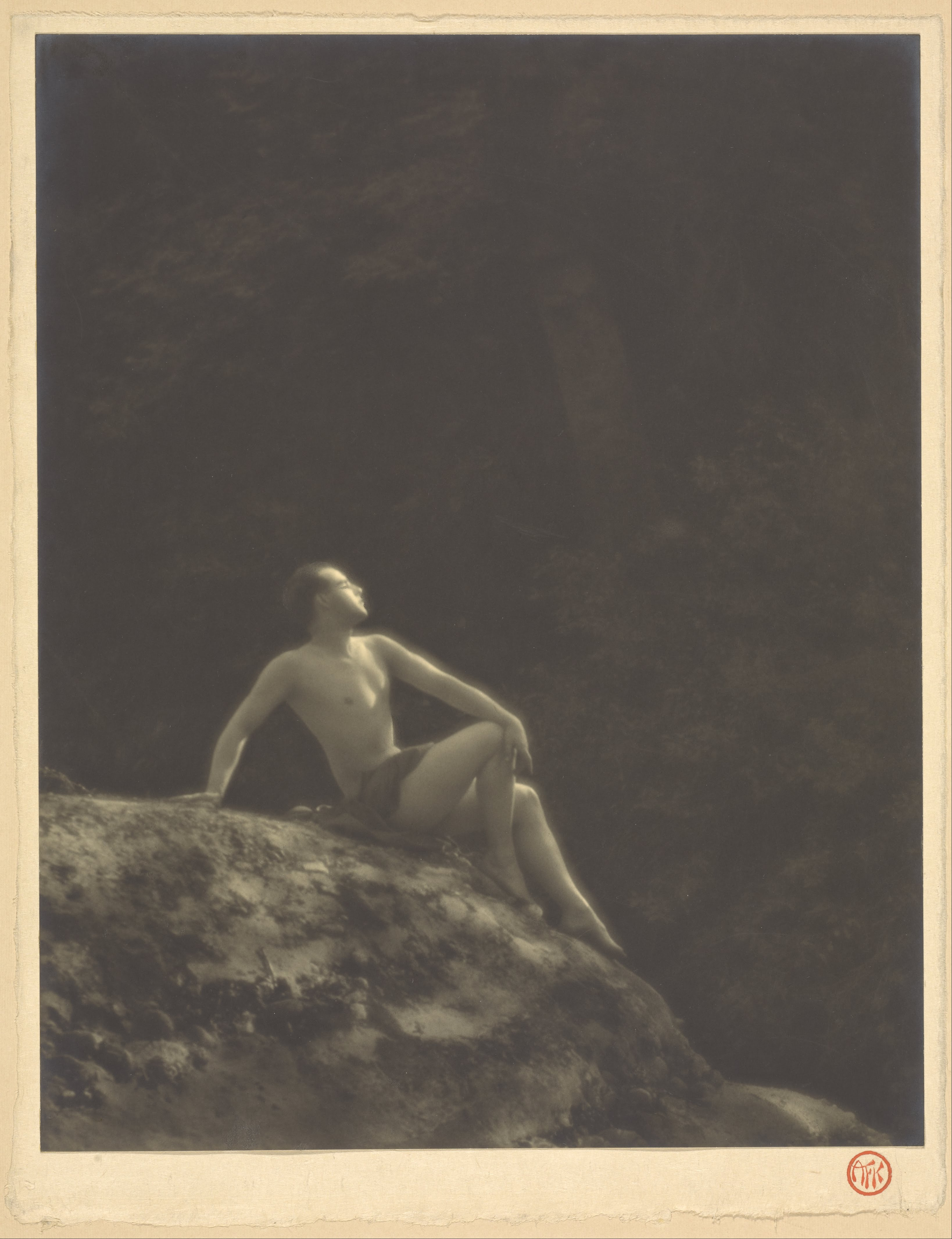
- Shawn in c. 1918
- Born: Edwin Meyers Shawn; October 21, 1891; Kansas City, Missouri, U.S.
- Died: January 9, 1972 (aged 80)
- Occupation: Dancer
- Spouse: Ruth St. Denis (1914–1968)

Ted Shawn (born Edwin Myers Shawn; October 21, 1891 – January 9, 1972) was an American dancer and choreographer. Considered a pioneer of American modern dance, he created the Denishawn School together with his wife Ruth St. Denis. After their separation he created the all-male company Ted Shawn and His Men Dancers. With his innovative ideas of masculine movement, he was one of the most influential choreographers and dancers of his day. He was also the founder and creator of Jacob's Pillow Dance Festival in Massachusetts.

== Ted Shawn and the creation of Denishawn ==
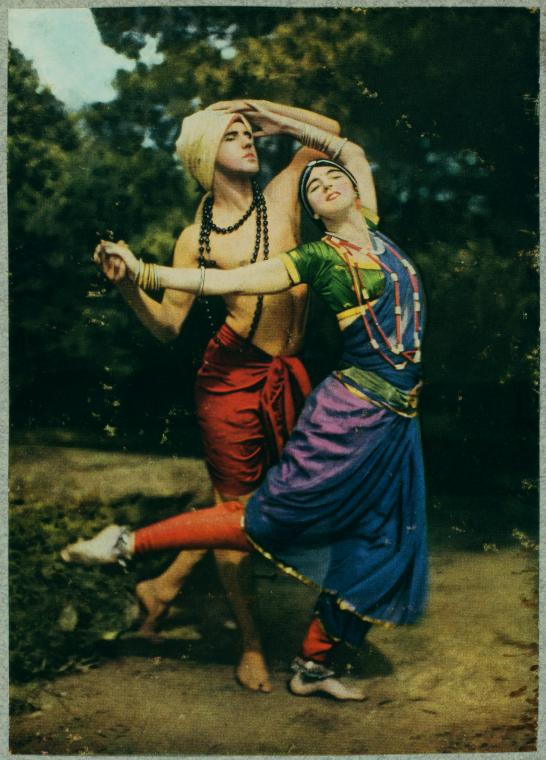
Ted Shawn with dancer and wife Ruth St. Denis in 1916.

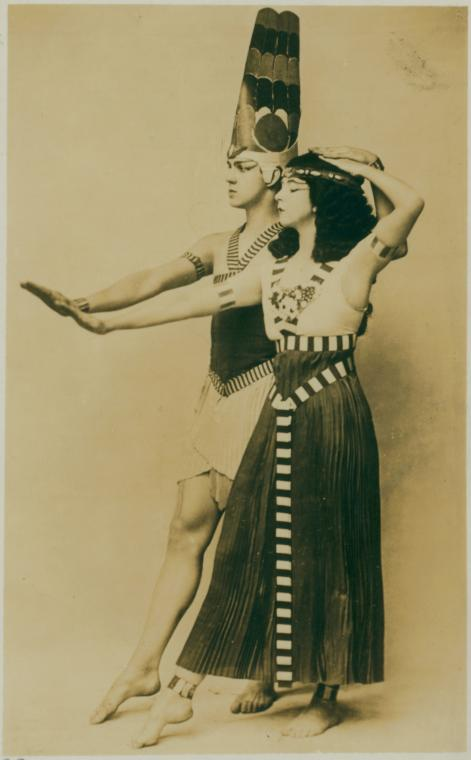
Ted Shawn and Ruth St. Denis in Egyptian Ballet

Ted Shawn was born in Kansas City, Missouri on October 21, 1891. Originally intending to become a minister of religion, he attended the University of Denver where he caught diphtheria at the age of 19, causing him temporary paralysis from the waist down. It was during his physical therapy for the disease that Shawn was introduced to dance in 1910, studying with Hazel Wallack, a former dancer with the Metropolitan Opera. In 1912, Shawn relocated to Los Angeles where he became part of an exhibition ballroom dance troupe with Norma Gould as his partner.

After moving to New York in 1914, Shawn married Ruth St. Denis on August 13, two months after their meeting. St. Denis served not only as a partner but an extremely valuable creative outlet to Shawn. Both artists believed strongly in the potential for dance as an art form becoming integrated into everyday life. The combination of their mutual artistic vision and Shawn's business knowledge led to the couple opening the first Denishawn School in Los Angeles, California in 1915, with the goal of melding dance with body, mind and spirit.

Notable performances choreographed by him during Denishawn's 17-year run include Invocation to the Thunderbird (1917), the solo Danse Americaine, performed by Charles Weidman (1923), Julnar of the Sea, Xochitl performed by Martha Graham (1920) and Les Mystères Dionysiaques. In addition to spawning the careers of Weidman and Graham, the Denishawn school also housed Louise Brooks and Doris Humphrey as students.

== Style and technique ==
Together, Shawn and Ruth St. Denis established an eclectic grouping of dance techniques including ballet (done without shoes) and movement that focused less on rigidity and more on the freeing of the upper body. To add to St. Denis's mainly eastern influence, Shawn introduced elements of North African, Spanish, American and Amerindian dance, ushering in a new era of modern American dance. Breaking with European traditions, their choreography connected the physical and spiritual, often drawing from ancient, indigenous, and international sources.

== Ted Shawn and His Male Dancers ==
I believe that dance communicates man's deepest, highest and most truly spiritual thoughts and emotions far better than words, spoken or written.

— attributed to Ted Shawn,
in Outback and Beyond

Due to Shawn's marital problems and financial difficulties, Denishawn closed in the early 1930s. Subsequently, Shawn formed an all-male dance company of athletes he taught at Springfield College, with the mission to fight for acceptance of the American male dancer and to bring awareness of the art form from a male perspective.

The all-male company was based out of a farm that Shawn purchased near Lee, Massachusetts. On July 14, 1933, Ted Shawn and His Men Dancers had their premier performance at Shawn's farm, which would later be known as Jacob's Pillow Dance Festival. Shawn produced some of his most innovate and controversial choreography to date with this company such as "Ponca Indian Dance", "Sinhalese Devil Dance", "Maori War Haka", "Hopi Indian Eagle Dance", "Dyak Spear Dances", and "Kinetic Molpai". Through these creative works Shawn showcased athletic and masculine movement that soon would gain popularity. The company performed in the United States and Canada, touring more than 750 cities, in addition to international success in London and Havana. Ted Shawn and His Men Dancers concluded at Jacob's Pillow on August 31, 1940, with a homecoming performance.

Shawn had a romantic relationship with one of his dancers, Barton Mumaw, from 1931 to 1948. One of the leading stars of the company, Barton Mumaw would emerge onto the dance industry and be considered "the American Nijinsky". While with Shawn, Mumaw began a relationship with John Christian, a stage manager for the company. Mumaw introduced Shawn to Christian. Later, Shawn formed a partnership with Christian, with whom he stayed from 1949 until his death in 1972.

=== Jacob's Pillow ===
Ted Shawn resting on the Jacob's Pillow Rock

With this new company came the creation of Jacob's Pillow: a dance school, retreat, and theater. The facilities also hosted teas, which, over time, became the Jacob's Pillow Dance Festival. Shawn also created The School of Dance for Men around this time, which helped promote male dance in colleges nationwide.

Shawn taught classes at Jacob's Pillow just months before his death at the age of 80. In 1965, Shawn was a Heritage Award recipient of the National Dance Association. Shawn's final appearance on stage in the Ted Shawn Theater at Jacob's Pillow was in Siddhas of the Upper Air, where he reunited with St. Denis for their fiftieth anniversary.

Saratoga Springs is now the home of the National Museum of Dance, the United States' only museum dedicated to professional dance. Shawn was inducted into the museum's Mr. & Mrs. Cornelius Vanderbilt Whitney Hall of Fame in 1987.

== Writings ==
Ted Shawn wrote and published nine books that provided a foundation for Modern Dance:

- 1920 – Ruth St. Denis: Pioneer and Prophet
- 1926 – The American Ballet
- 1929 – Gods Who Dance
- 1935 – Fundamentals of a Dance Education
- 1940 – Dance We Must
- 1944 – How Beautiful Upon the Mountain
- 1954 – Every Little Movement: a Book About Francois Delsarte
- 1959 – Thirty-three Years of American Dance
- 1960 – One Thousand and One Night Stands (autobiography, with Gray Poole)

== Legacy ==
In the 1940s, Shawn bestowed his works to the Museum of Modern Art. The museum subsequently deaccessed these works, giving them to New York Public Library for the Performing Arts and Jacob's Pillow archive, while Shawn was still alive. Dancer Adam Weinert saw this as a violation of MoMA's policy not to sell or give away works by living artists, and created The Reaccession of Ted Shawn, digital, augmented reality performances of Shawn's works to be displayed in MoMA.

== See also ==
- List of dancers
