= Jacob's Pillow =

Dance center in Becket, Massachusetts

- U.S. National Register of Historic Places
- U.S. National Historic Landmark District
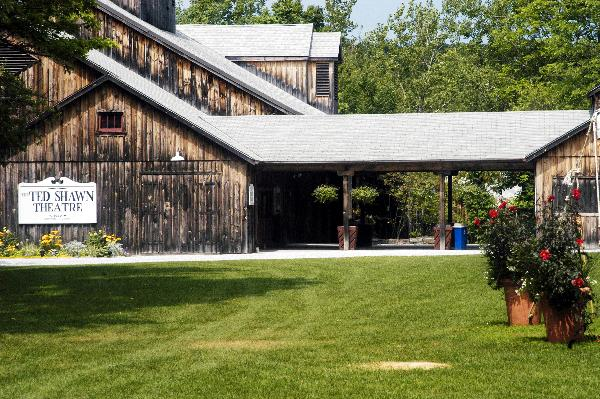
- The Ted Shawn Theatre

- Location within Massachusetts Location within the United States
- Location: George Carter Rd. Becket, Massachusetts, United States
- Coordinates: 42°15′52″N 73°7′5″W
- Area: 220 acres (89 ha)
- Built: 1931
- Architect: Joseph Franz
- Architectural style: Federal, Bungalow/Craftsman
- NRHP reference No.: 00001458; 03000644

Significant dates
- Added to NRHP: February 5, 2001; May 27, 2003
- Designated NHLD: May 27, 2003

Jacob's Pillow is a dance center, school and performance space located in Becket, Massachusetts, in the Berkshires. The facility itself was listed as a National Historic Landmark District in 2003.

== History ==
The site of Jacob's Pillow in Becket, Massachusetts, was "originally" settled in 1790 by Jacob Carter III. Due to the zigzagging road leading to the hilltop property, it became known as "Jacob's Ladder", after the Biblical story, and a pillow-shaped rock on the property prompted the farm to acquire the name "Jacob's Pillow".

The farm was purchased in 1931 by modern dance pioneer Ted Shawn as a dance retreat. Shawn and his wife, Ruth St. Denis, led the highly regarded Denishawn Company, which popularized dance forms rooted in theatre and cultural traditions outside European ballet. They were influential in training a host of dance pioneers, including Martha Graham, Charles Weidman, Doris Humphrey, and Jack Cole.

Ted Shawn laying his head upon the Jacob's Pillow Rock

Shawn's objective was to establish a dance organization for American men. The early corps of his all-male company built many of the structures on the Jacob's Pillow campus. This effort came to an end in 1940 with the advent of American involvement in World War II; Shawn's company disbanded and most of its members joined the military.

Significant debt forced Shawn to consider a sale of the property. In 1940, he leased the property to dance teacher Mary Washington Ball, but her summer festival was also financially unsuccessful. British ballet stars Alicia Markova and Anton Dolin learned of Shawn's financial difficulties and decided to acquire the property. With financial backing and fundraising support from millionaire Reginald Wright, $50,000 was raised to purchase the property and construct a theatre building. The summer dance festival was revived, and Shawn was retained as its director.

In 1967 Shawn's declining health led the board to appoint John Christian, Shawn's domestic partner and longtime collaborator, as executive director of Jacob's Pillow while Shawn maintained the title of founding director. As his health declined, Shawn relinquished more of his responsibilities to Christian with Christian being the primary leader of the festival during the last of Shawn's life. He maintained the title of founding director until his death in 1972. Christian continued to lead Jacob's Pillow after his death.

In 2003, the Jacob's Pillow property was declared a National Historic Landmark District by the federal government as "an exceptional cultural venue that holds value for all Americans". It is the only dance entity in the U.S. to receive this honor. In March 2011, Jacob's Pillow was named a recipient of the 2010 National Medal of Arts, a national award of distinction.

The Doris Duke Theatre, one of two indoor performance spaces, was destroyed in a fire on November 17, 2020.

== Performances ==
The Pillow presents international dance in many forms, styles, and traditions.

A performance on the outdoor Henry J. Leir Stage

Pillow founder Ted Shawn was instrumental in beginning the careers of Martha Graham and Jack Cole, and the Pillow has continued this mentoring role in the careers of artists such as Alvin Ailey, José Limón, and Mark Morris. Companies such as Dance Theatre of Harlem, the Parsons Dance Company, and Trey McIntyre Project made their debuts at the Pillow, and international groups such as The Royal Danish Ballet, Nederlands Dans Theatre, Black Grace and Hofesh Shechter Company have made their U.S. debuts here. World premieres have been commissioned from choreographers such as Merce Cunningham and Paul Taylor, and artists such as Margot Fonteyn and Mikhail Baryshnikov have been showcased in works.

Performances at Jacob's Pillow take place in two venues. The Ted Shawn Theatre which was renovated in 2022 and included a new ventilation and air cooling system, the creation of an orchestra pit, enhanced accessibility for artists backstage and audience seating, increased stage depth, a new industry standard electrical system, expanded clearance height to 25 feet, a new indoor artist crossover, and a new lower level with flexible dressing rooms, wardrobe spaces, an elevator, and accessible ramp system, and a maintenance space.

The second venue is the outdoor Henry J. Leir Stage, which presents the Inside/Out Performance Series, free performances of established and emerging artists from all over the world in an informal, outdoor venue set against a panoramic vista of the Berkshire hills.

== Doris Duke Theatre ==
The Doris Duke Theatre was built in 1990 as one of three main performance spaces on Jacob's Pillow's 220-acre campus in Western Massachusetts. It was destroyed by fire on the morning of November 17, 2020, which was reported at around 7 am EST.

In October 2023, the Pillow unveiled plans for the rebuilt Doris Duke Theatre, designed by Mecanoo, New York-based design firm Marvel, and Jeffrey Gibson. The new theatre will be twice as large as the old one and will feature a fire pit, a medicinal garden (both as nods to the Mohicans and other Native American tribes in the area), and a green roof that will collect rainwater and reduce noise during dance performances. The Pillow plans to turn the building's rear area, often used as an informal gathering place, into an "artist quadrangle"; the slope will be changed to accommodate performances, and the Pillow will add extra seating and large, decorative rocks along the quadrangle's edges. In late 2024, the Pillow announced that the new theater would open on July 9, 2025.

== Community Programs ==
Jacob's Pillow hosts several long-standing community programs, such as Jacob's Pillow Curriculum in Motion and the Curriculum in Motion Institute. The co-founders of Jacob's Pillow Curriculum in Motion are Pillow Artist-Educator Celeste Miller, and The Carole & Dan Burack Director of the School at Jacob's Pillow, "J.R." Glover.

== The School at Jacob's Pillow ==
Students of The School at Jacob's Pillow in rehearsal

The School at Jacob's Pillow is based out of the Perles Family Studio and is a conservatory-style curriculum of five programs: Ballet, Contemporary Traditions, Cultural Traditions, Tap/Musical Theatre, and the Ann & Weston Hicks Choreography Fellows Program. The dancers' schedule includes six days each week with four professional-level studio classes each day, coaching sessions, weekly performances for the public, master classes with Festival artists, talks led by Scholars-in-Residence, study assignments in the Pillow's Archives, and attendance at all Festival performances and events.

Faculty of The School at Jacob's Pillow have included Susan Jaffe, Amanda McKerrow, Chet Walker, Nikolaj Hubbe, Anna-Marie Holmes, Milton Myers, Katherine Dunham, Rennie Harris, Matt Mattox, Soledad Barrio, Tim Rushton, Finis Jhung, Martin Santangelo, Mercedes Ellington, Stephanie Saland, Victor Plotnikov, Annie-B Parson, Paul Lazar, Aszure Barton, Helen Pickett, Banu Ogan, Mr. Wiggles, Marjory Smarth, Dana Moore, and Ric Ryder.

Alumni of The School include MacArthur Grant-winner Meredith Monk, choreographer Mia Michaels, former Alvin Ailey Dance Theater and Paul Taylor Dance Company principal Linda Kent, artistic director of the Royal Danish Ballet Nikolaj Hübbe, recent winner of FOX's television show So You Think You Can Dance, Joshua Allen, and Robert Swinston of Merce Cunningham Dance Company.

== Archives ==
The core collections preserved in the archives at Jacob's Pillow were originally assembled by founder Ted Shawn. Materials have been added since the 1930s by volunteers from the Pillow Board and staff. In 1991, Jacob's Pillow created the position of Director of Preservation to direct the activities and maintenance of the Archives. The Archives have approximately 6,000 films and videos from 1894 to present, 45,000 historic dance photos and negatives, 313,000 pages of unique printed materials, 27 trunks of costumes dating from 1915, and 2,000 books. The Archives is one component of the Pillow's Preservation Program, which organizes exhibits exploring various aspects of dance, oversees issues concerning the National Historic Landmark site, and records the ongoing activities of the Festival.

The archives is internationally recognized as a major repository of dance materials. Access to the research facility is open to the public year-round by appointment and is available during the summer season from noon until the end of each performance, six days a week. The Archives collection is electronically catalogued, and much of it is accessible through the Pillow's website.

Blake's Barn is an 18th-century structure that was relocated and reconfigured specifically for preservation activity. This facility was donated by stage and screen dancer/actress Marge Champion and is named in honor of her late son. In addition to a central area for exhibits and lectures, the building houses a reading room with video stations providing access to the moving image collection. The lower level contains temperature-controlled storage areas and video production equipment.

In 2011, Jacob's Pillow launched Jacob's Pillow Dance Interactive, an online resource of video clips curated from the Archives in Becket. The archive features performances that have taken place at the festival from 1937 to 2010, including footage rarely seen. This user-friendly free resource allows the user to browse dance footage by artist, genre, and era. The Director of Preservation, Norton Owen, curates the collection. Each entry includes a video clip, an informative paragraph describing the dancer/choreographer, and an artist portrait.

== See also ==
- List of National Historic Landmarks in Massachusetts
- National Register of Historic Places listings in Berkshire County, Massachusetts
- Ella Baff, executive director of Jacob's Pillow Dance Festival from 1998 until 2015
