= Moment Rustica (ballet) =

Moment Rustica was a Martha Graham ballet performed to the music of Francis Poulenc. It premiered on April 14, 1929, at the Booth Theatre in New York City. The performance marked the debut of Graham's concert ensemble, Martha Graham and Group, the predecessor of the Martha Graham Dance Company.

The piece was choreographed for the entire ensemble. Members of the group included: Kitty Reese, Irene Emery, Ethel Rudy, Lillian Ray, Hortense Bunsick, Sylivia Wasserstrom, Mary Rivoire, Ruth White, Lillian Shapero, Virginia Briton, Sylvia Rosenstein, Evelyn Sabin, Betty Macdonald and Rosina Savelli. The program included a total of 13 works. Graham performed the solos Dance, Four Insincerities, Fragments, Adolescence (Prelude and Song) and Resurrection. Sabin, Macdonald and Savelli appeared in Danse Languide, Dance Piece, Spires and Ronde. The entire ensemble performed Heretic, Vision of the Apocalypse, Sketches from the People and Moment Rustica.

Dance Magazine's reviewer noted that Moment Rustica was in the "vein of grotesquerie and humor" and "remarkable more for what it implied than for what it actually represented." The critic interpreted the costumes as representative of a "peasant scene" and the choreography "notable for an economy of movement seldom paralleled in so vigorous and lusty a composition." Louis Horst's piano accompaniment was called "sympathetic and invaluable."
