= John Marquardt =

John Marquardt

John Marquardt (October 16, 1859 – June 8, 1943) was a German-born American violinist. He was initially trained as a musician by his father and began his career as a maker of violins. He subsequently trained as a concert violinist in Berlin prior to immigrating to the United States in 1894. He served as concertmaster for several American orchestras during his career; including holding that position with the Cleveland Philharmonic Orchestra (1889-1891), the Chicago Symphony Orchestra (1892–1893), the Philadelphia Orchestra (1902–1903), and the Seattle Symphony (1907–1908). His wife and frequent performance partner was the harpist Alexandria Marquardt.

== Early life and education ==
John Marquardt was born in Estebrügge, Germany on October 16, 1859. He received his initial training in violin and piano for his father, and spent his early career as a maker of violins. He studied violin in Berlin with Joseph Joachim, Emanuel Wirth, and Émile Sauret; attending the Royal Music Institute of Berlin in 1882-1883. After this he toured with conductor Hans Richter for performances in London, France, and Germany.

== Early career in the United States ==
1891 image of John Marquardt

Marquardt immigrated to the United States in May 1884. By 1886 he was the first violinist in Bernhard Listemann's Boston Philharmonic, and was also first violinist of the Mendelssohn Quintet Club with whom he played on to tour to New York City's Chickering Hall in late November 1886. In June 1887 he performed in concert with the Toronto Choral Society. In the 1887-1888 season he was a soloist in concerts with the Cleveland Philharmonic Orchestra (CPO) conducted by Emil Ring and the Buffalo Symphony Orchestra (no relation to the current orchestra) conducted by John Lund. In 1889 he was appointed concertmaster of the CPO, and the first violinist in the Philharmonic Quartet (the string quartet associated with the CPO). He also appointed to the violin faculty at the Cleveland Conservatory of Music. In 1890 he played Beethoven's Violin Concerto with the CPO.

In May 1891 Marquardt left the CPO when he succeeded Richard Aronold as first violinist in the New York Philharmonic Club (NYPC); a chamber group made up of players in the New York Philharmonic (NYP). Paul Egry was appointed Marquadt's replacement as concertmaster of the CPO. He played with the NYP for the 1891-1892 season, and then return to the CPO as concertmaster in the autumn of 1892. In October 1892 he left the CPO after accepting an offer by Theodore Thomas to join the Chicago Symphony Orchestra (CSO). He signed a contract with the orchestra with the post of "second concert master and soloist". He played with the CSO for the 1892-1893 season, and performed with the orchestra at the World's Columbian Exposition. He then left the ensemble and returned to New York in the autumn of 1893.

== California musician ==
By February 1894 Marquart was concertmaster of Fritz Scheel's Vienna Prater orchestra which was in residence in San Francisco at the California Midwinter International Exposition of 1894. In September 1894 he married the harpist Alexandria Breitschuck in San Francisco. Alexandria was harpist in Scheel's orchestra at the time of their marriage. In the Spring of 1895 he was concertmaster of an orchestra led by Adolf Willhartitz at Hazard's Pavilion in Los Angeles. After this he left for a concert tour with his wife to Hawaii and Australia; leaving via steamship on June 15, 1895. This tour also included performances in New Zealand, and the couple returned from this tour in December 1895 at which point the settled in San Francisco where they worked as teachers and musicians.

In 1896 Marquart was concertmaster of orchestra in San Francisco that accompanied soprano Amalie Materna and violinist František Ondříček. He was also conductor of a small orchestra in residence at the The Emporium department store in San Francisco that gave daily afternoon and evening concerts. In 1897 he became concertmaster of the San Francisco Symphony Society (SFSS) which was then led by conductor Gustav Hinrichs. In 1898 he was appointed conductor of the orchestra at The Louvre resort at the corner of Powell and Eddy streets.

By 1899 Marquart was an active member of San Francisco's Bohemian Club, and was leading his own string quartet in San Francisco. In 1900 he was appointed the leader of an orchestra in residence at a resort in San Francisco owned by Charles Zinkand, and concurrently served as concertmaster of a newly reorganized SFSS now led by conductor Henry Holmes.

== Later life and career ==
John and Alexandria Marquardt in 1907.

In July 1901 Marquardt and his wife left San Francisco on a ship bound for Hong Kong to begin a "world tour" of concerts which included a planned stop in their native Germany to see their relatives. After returning to the United States, Marquardt was appointed concertmaster of the Philadelphia Orchestra (PO) in September 1902. His wife was also appointed the PO's harpist at this time. They played with the PO for the 1902-1903 season, but then returned to San Francisco by August 1903 where Marquardt resumed working at The Emporium.

In 1906 Marquardt and his wife left San Francisco on a second world tour. Upon their return to the United States in 1907, the couple joined the Seattle Symphony with Marquardt as concertmaster and his wife as harpist. He remained in that position for the 1907-1908 season. After this the couple spent time performing in Brussels, Belgium in the autumn of 1908. Upon returning to the United States in 1909 the couple played in Nathan Franko's Orchestra in New York City. In 1910 they spent time performing in concerts in Texas before returning once again to California, and in 1911 they gave a series of concerts in Santa Barbara.

In September 1911 Marquardt and his wife opened a studio to teach violin and harp on Fillmore Street in San Francisco. In 1912 Marquardt gave a series of recitals in Hawaii, followed by performances with his wife in Australia, New Zealand, and South Africa. Upon returning to the United States in 1913 they settled in San Diego. In the summer of 1914 they were engaged as performers at the Alamo Hotel in Colorado Springs. Shortly after moving to Pasadena, California] in 1916 the couple gave a concert there sponsored by The Fine Arts Club of Pasadena. In 1917 they joined the teaching staff of the California Temple of the Arts, a music conservatory in Los Angeles.

Marquardt and his wife remained active as teachers and musicians in Southern California in the 1920s. One of John's pupils was Louis Horst. In 1932 they retired and relocated to Hollywood, California where they purchased a home on Commonwealth Ave. They returned to Pasadena in 1937; purchasing a home at 1194 Washington Street. Alexandria Marquardt died on April 23, 1943.

John Marquardt died in Pasadena on June 8, 1943. The cause was a heart attack.
