= Lugubre (ballet) =

Modern dance solo

Lugubre was a modern dance solo choreographed by Martha Graham to music by Alexander Scriabin. The piece was originally part of Five Poems, a ballet divided into five solo sections: Fragilité, Lugubre, Poeme ailé, Danse Languide and Désir (first performed in 1926). Each of the sections appears in various programs as individual solos. Five Poems premiered on October 16, 1927, at the Little Theatre in New York City.

Other works on the program were Choral; Adagio (from second Suite); Scherzo, Op. 16 No.2; Tanzstück; Deux Valses; Danse; Tanagra; Esquisse Antique; Lucrezia; Alt-Wein; La Cancion; Ronde; Two Poems of the East and Baal Shem. Graham performed with her small company of dancers: Evelyn Sabin, Betty MacDonald and Rosina Savelli.

As with many of Graham's early pieces, the choreography and other details of the ballet are lost. It is known, though, that her approach to making dances during this time was Delsartean. Rejecting her teachers' Denishawn (Ruth St. Denis and Ted Shawn) forms, Graham initially drew on older, simpler dance concepts. These "pure objective Delsarte vignettes, depictions of moods and emotions" were "not quite camouflaged by their foreign titles and modern music." The mostly late-1920s works include Fragilité, Lugubre, Scherza and Four Insincerities.
