= Adolescence (ballet) =

Dance solo choreographed by Martha Graham

Adolescence (Prelude and Song) was an early modern dance solo choreographed by Martha Graham to music by Paul Hindemith. It premiered on March 2, 1929, at the Booth Theatre in New York City.

The all-solo program included two other new works, Danza and Resurrection, and eight previously performed pieces: Dance, Immigrant, Valses Sentimentales, Four Insincerities, Tanagra, Two Variations from Sonatina, Fragilité and Fragments.

Seattle's Week Town Crier described the work as depicting youth, "curious, yearning, fearful, swept away by strange visions and dreams. A very difficult, complex thing made sweepingly beautiful by its utter simplicity and sincerity." Dance Magazine's reviewer called the solo "delicate and sensitive."

The New York Times critic wrote, "The dancer has achieved an exquisite result. Simple and stark in design, it is at the same time warm and tender in mood, childishly frank and yet deft and penetrating. It is the happiest use Miss Graham has yet made of her economy of movement, and perhaps the least inclined in the direction of ugliness."
