= Danza (ballet) =

Danza was a modern dance solo choreographed and danced by Martha Graham to music by Darius Milhaud. It premiered on March 3, 1929, at the Booth Theatre in New York City.

As with much of Graham's early choreography, little else is known about Danza. The New York Times' critic interpreted the work as "a fantasia on peasant themes, sometimes Spanish, sometimes Italian, sometimes Balkan in suggestion. Its interest lies in its impression of dance movement where there is actually only the barest skeleton of such movement."

The all-solo program included two other new pieces, Resurrection and Adolescence, and eight previously performed works: Dance, Immigrant, Valses Sentimentales, Four Insincerities, Tanagra, Two Variations from Sonatina, Fragilite and Fragments. Louis Horst accompanied Graham on piano.
