= Scherza (ballet) =

Dance Solo choreographed by Martha Graham

Scherza was a modern dance solo choreographed by Martha Graham to music by Robert Schumann. It premiered on December 10, 1927, at a special performance for the Cornell Dramatic Club. The program was billed as the Adolph Bolm Dance Recital. In addition to Graham and Bohm, the performance featured Ruth Page, Vera Mirova, Bernice Holmes and Marcia Preble. Graham appeared in two solo works, Scherza and Tanagra.

As with many of her early pieces, the choreography and other details of the ballet are lost. It is known, though, that her approach to making dances during this time frame was Delsartean. In rejection of her teachers' Denishawn (Ruth St. Denis and Ted Shawn) forms, Graham initially drew on earlier dance concepts. These "pure objective Delsarte vignettes, depictions of moods and emotions" were "not quite camouflaged by their foreign titles and modern music." The mostly late-1920s works include Fragilité, Lugubre, Scherza and Four Insincerities.
