= Irene Emery =

American art and textile historian

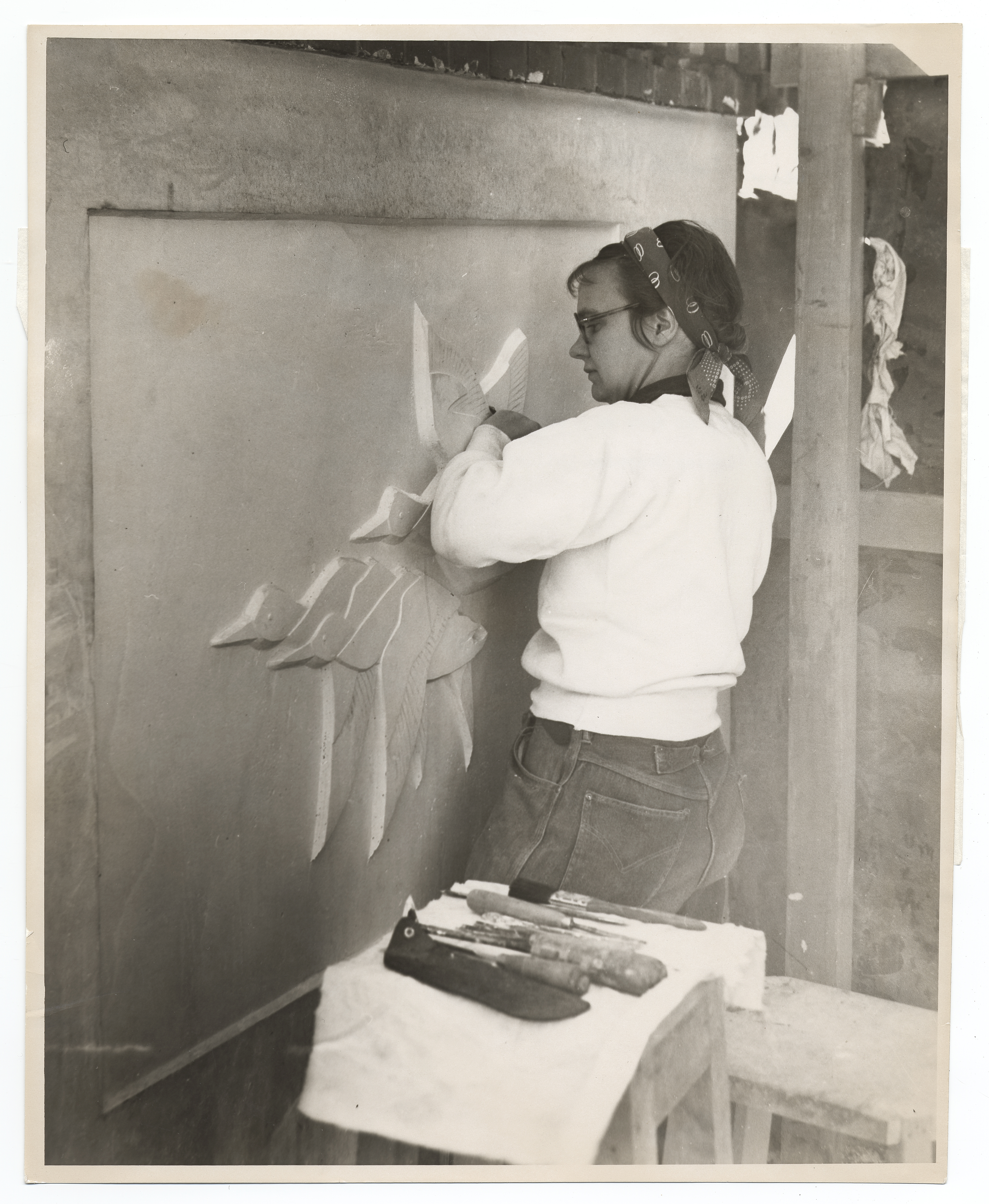
- Irene Emery (c. 1937) carving wall of sun bath at Carrie Tingley Hospital for Crippled Children at Hot Springs, New Mexico
- Born: February 1, 1900; Grand Rapids, Michigan, U.S.
- Died: May 21, 1981 (aged 81)
- Education: Central School of Hygiene and Physical Education, University of Arizona
- Alma mater: University of Wisconsin–Madison, School of the Art Institute of Chicago
- Occupations: Art historian; scholar; curator; textile anthropologist; sculptor; modern dancer

Irene Emery (1900–1981) was an American art historian, scholar, curator, textile anthropologist, sculptor, and modern dancer. She was known for her pioneering research in systematically describing global textiles, and was a leading authority on ancient fabrics and textiles, and for her published book The Primary Structures of Fabrics: An Illustrated Classification (1966).

Emery had worked at the Textile Museum from 1954 until 1970. Additionally she had worked as a sculptor for the Federal Art Project, and was a modern dancer in Martha Graham Dance Company.

== Early life and early education ==
Irene Emery was born on February 1, 1900, in Grand Rapids, Michigan. She was a descent of industrialist William T. Powers on her maternal side.

She trained in dancing at the Central School of Hygiene and Physical Education in New York City; followed by study at the University of Wisconsin–Madison of dance under Margaret H'Doubler, and of weaving under Helen Louise Allen.

== Dance career ==
After graduating from the degree program at the University of Wisconsin, Emery moved to New York City to study under Martha Graham and taught dance at the Chapin School. In 1930, she was roommates with dancer Kitty Reese. Emery was one of dancers in Graham's notable dance presentations, Heretic (1929); Martha Graham's Moment Rustica (1929); and in Léonide Massine's The Rite of Spring (1930). During The Rite of Spring rehearsals, she broke her ankle but continued to dance on the broken ankle, which caused permanent damage and forced her to leave dancing.

== Sculpture career ==
She decided to return to college, studying sculpture at the School of the Art Institute of Chicago. After her studies she moved to New Mexico, where worked on local art commissions and worked for the Federal Art Project. Emery was diagnosed with myasthenia gravis which causes muscle weakness, so she could no longer physically continue her sculpture work.

== Textile historian and anthropology career ==
When Emery she was a dancer, she experienced constructing dance costumes. In order to make future costumes she had started collecting textiles in a box. When she could no longer be a sculptor, she started to create textiles with embroidery, followed by weaving. She experimented with different, untraditional textile techniques. In the winter of 1941, she attended the University of Arizona to further her knowledge of textiles.

In the summer 1944, she had a temporary job appointment as a "government weaver" with the goal of conserving Navajo rug and blanket weaving traditions at the Southwestern Range and Sheep Breeding Laboratory in the Cibola National Forest. She worked alongside Navajo weaver Lillian Brown for a month, engaging with both hand-spun and machined yarn. This role set her up for a new career path towards textile anthropology, where she observed disparity in the classification systems. In 1947, she was hired as a research assistant at the Museum of Indian Arts and Culture (formerly named Laboratory of Anthropology and the Museum of New Mexico, which merged).

In 1954, Emery was appointed "research curator of technical studies" at the Textile Museum in Washington, D.C., where she remained until 1970. Her work helped to define textiles (i.e., warp and weft) from other types of fabrics (such as felt or looping).

Starting in 1973 after she retired from her position at the museum, Emery created an annual workshop for academics in the field of textiles, named the Irene Emery Roundtable on Museum Textiles.

== Awards ==
- 1951– Anthropological Research grant, Wenner-Gren Foundation
- 1953 – Fine Arts Research grant, Guggenheim Fellowship

== Publications ==
- Emery, Irene (1966). The Primary Structures of Fabrics: An Illustrated Classification. Washington, D.C.: The Textile Museum. ISBN 9780823043941.
- Emery, Irene; Fiske, Patricia L., eds. (1977). Ethnographic Textiles of the Western Hemisphere: Irene Emery Roundtable on Museum Textiles, 1976 Proceedings. Washington, D.C.: Textile Museum.
- Emery, Irene; Fiske, Patricia L., eds. (1977). Looms and Their Products: 1977 Proceedings. Katherine T. Freshley (contribution). Washington, D.C.: Textile Museum.

== See also ==
- Women in the art history field
