= Goldie Russler =

American Yiddish actress (1904–1997)

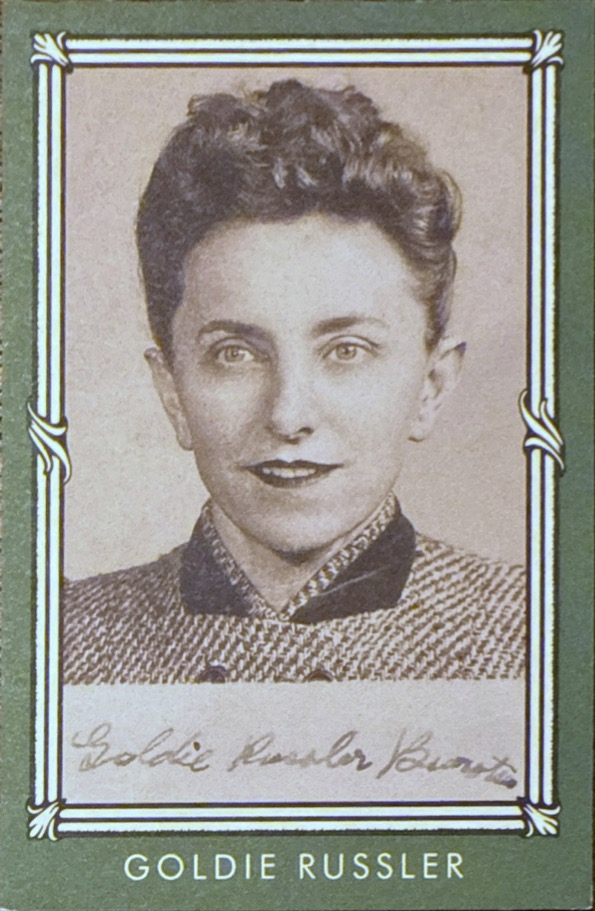
- Russler in a promotional still for Ristokratn, c. 1930.
- Born: Golda Rosler; 1904; Ukraine
- Died: 1997 (aged 92–93); New York City, U.S.
- Occupations: Actress, singer
- Years active: 1924–1951
- Spouse: Abraham Burstein (m. 1946)

Goldie Russler (1904–1997) was an American actress and singer in the Yiddish theatre, best known for her tenure with the avant-garde Artef (Arbeter Teater Farband) troupe in New York City. A specialist in Yiddish folk songs, Russler was a significant figure in the worker-oriented theater movement that flourished in the United States during the mid-20th century.

== Early life ==
Born Golda Rosler in present-day Ukraine, she immigrated to the United States in 1920. Settling in New York's Lower East Side, she became involved in the Yiddish cultural scene and received training in the worker-theater studios that formed the basis of the Artef collective.

== Career ==
=== Early years and Yiddish Art Theatre ===
Russler's professional stage career began in the early 1920s. On December 9, 1924, she appeared in the production of Day and Night (Tog un nakht) by S. Ansky at the Yiddish Art Theatre in New York City. The production was a significant continuation of Ansky's legacy, staged alongside notable figures such as Miriam Elias and Chaim Schneyer.

=== The Artef years (1929–1940) ===
In 1929, Russler became a founding member of the Artef company, a leftist, modernist theater collective. Unlike the commercial "shund" productions of Second Avenue, Artef sought to create "art theater" that addressed social and political themes through stylized, avant-garde techniques influenced by Soviet theatrical movements.

Between 1929 and 1938, Russler appeared in fourteen major productions, including:

- Ristokratn (Aristocrats) – An adaptation of Sholem Aleichem's play Mentshn (People), in which Russler played the role of Fanitshka.
- Rekrutn (The Recruits, 1934) – An adaptation of Israel Aksenfeld's work by Lipman Levin; noted as one of the troupe's most successful productions.
- Dos Groyse Gevins (The Big Lottery Win), also known as 200,000, by Sholem Aleichem.
- Haunch Paunch and Jowl – Based on the novel by Samuel Ornitz, which provided a satirical look at Jewish life in the Lower East Side.
- Clinton Street (1939) – A dramatization of the book by Chaver Paver (Gershon Einbinder) regarding Jewish life on the East Side, staged at the Mercury Theatre.

She was particularly celebrated for her vocal performances. Critics often noted her ability to integrate authentic Yiddish folk music into dramatic scenes, a skill that became her artistic trademark.

=== Later performances ===
Following the disbanding of Artef in the early 1940s, Russler continued to perform in variety shows and concerts. In December 1951, she was a featured soloist in the Jewish Music Alliance's annual concert at Hunter College Assembly Hall, performing the lead role in the folk operetta A Bunt mit a Statchke, directed by Lillian Shapero.

== Personal life ==
In 1946, Russler married Abraham Burstein and largely retired from the professional stage, though she remained a dedicated supporter of Yiddish culture. Russler is the aunt of composer Stefan Weisman.

== Legacy ==
Russler's career is documented in the Goldie Russler and Abraham Burstein Papers (MSS 47) at the Beinecke Rare Book & Manuscript Library at Yale University. The archive contains rare scripts, production photographs, and correspondence that document the history of the Yiddish Workers' Theater. In 2022, the Beinecke Library featured her as part of their "BRAVA: Women Make American Theater" series.
