= Katherine Fisk =

American singer

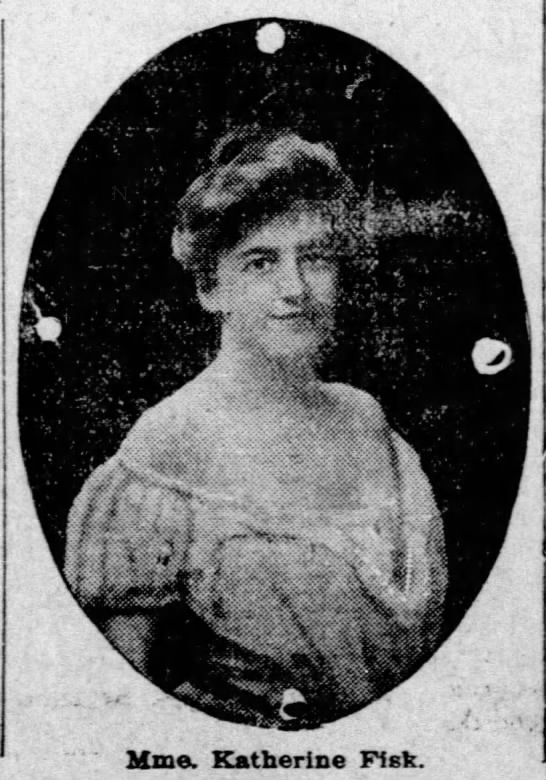

Background information
- Born: 1860s Clinton Junction, Wisconsin
- Died: June 27, 1926
- Occupation: Contralto

Katherine (Kate or Kitty) Louise Tanner Fisk (1860s – June 27, 1926) was an American contralto. Thanks to her singing and acting qualities, she received considerable acclaim for her performances in London, Illinois, New York and California.

== Early life and education ==
She was born in Clinton Junction, Wisconsin, and raised in Rockford, Illinois. Her mother was Margaret A. Tanner (died 1905). She graduated from Rockford College in 1881, in the same class as Jane Addams, who remained a friend.

In December 1881, she married Franklin Proctor Fisk, son of Rev. Franklin W. Fisk and principal of the Murray F. Tully High School in Chicago.

== Career ==
=== England ===
From 1892, she was particularly successful in London where she performed at St James's Hall (on this occasion, Musical News wrote "Mrs Katherine Fisk [...] has a magnificent voice, an artistic method, and a graceful presence; qualities which will, doubtless, secure her as many admirers here as they have done in America"), the Crystal Palace, and the Royal Albert Hall.

=== Illinois ===
In 1894 Willa Cather praised Fisk in a series of articles for the Lincoln Evening News. In 1895 Cather said about her "She is great enough as a woman to become a great artist" (at the time Fisk was performing with Nellie Melba in England).

In May 1894, together with Electa Gifford, Max Bendix, and Whitney Mockridge, she assisted George Ellsworth Holmes during his farewell concert at the Central Music Hall in Chicago.

In September 1894 she signed a two-year contract with the Lillian Russell Opera Company.

=== New York ===
In the late 1890s, Fisk settled with her husband in New York where she gave a number of recitals, singing with the Metropolitan Opera company.

In March 1898 she gave a soloist song recital at the Waldorf-Astoria in New York.

In May 1898 she assisted John Hyatt Brewer in an organ recital part of the Brooklyn Institute series given at the Lafayette Avenue Presbyterian Church. Fisk and Brewer performed together again in April 1906.

In June 1898 she presented the essay "The Voice as a Painter of Emotion" at the congress of musicians held in Omaha, Nebraska, under the direction of Homer Moore and under the auspices of the Bureau of Education of the Transmississippi Exposition.

In December 1898 she performed at the Auditorium in Chicago performing the Handel's Messiah; she was one of four soloists, the others being: Genevieve Clark Wilson, Whitney Mockridge, and Frank King Clark.

In March 1899 she performed with Ffrangcon Davies at a series of concerts by the Brooklyn Institute given in Association Hall. On this occasion, the music critic of The Standard Union, commented: "Mrs. Fisk, who sang songs in English, German, French and Scotch, pleased her admirers. The middle register of her voice is very beautiful. In singing her chest tones she forces her voice, thereby producing a disagreeable throaty quality of tone. Her high tones are generally pleasant. But whatever her vocal defects are, Mrs. Fisk is an intelligent singer, who enunciates most distinctly the words in the different languages. The contralto shows herself, too, to be a thorough student, for she sang her entire list of songs from memory."

In April 1901 she performed at the recital at the Schenley Theatre given in memory of Ethelbert Nevin.

In September 1910 she performed solo with the New York Philarmonica Orchestra at the Madison Square Garden.

=== California ===
In October 1903 she performed with Lillian Nordica and Nathan Franko in Los Angeles. On this occasion the music critic of the Los Angeles Express commented: "J.S. Duss, Lillian Nordica, Katherine Fisk and Nathan Franko are artists whose fame entitles them to the hearty support of the musical public."

In 1917 Fisk moved to Los Angeles. She died in a Pasadena sanatorium on June 27, 1926.
