= Heretic (ballet) =

Dance work by Martha Graham

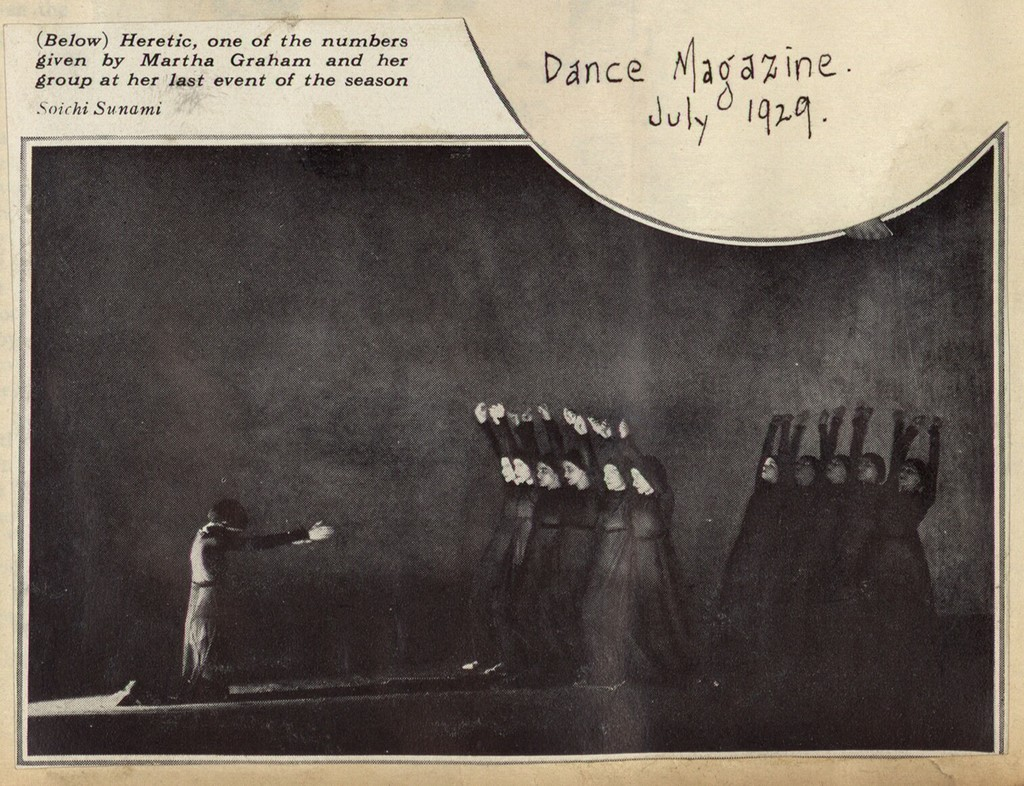
Martha Graham's Heretic by Soichi Sunami

Heretic is a modern dance work by Martha Graham performed to Tetus Breton, an old folk tune from Brittany. Louis Horst, Graham's musical director, recommended the song, part of the collection Chansons de la Fleur de Lys as arranged by Charles De Sivry. The dance premiered with the title Heretic at New York's Booth Theatre on April 14, 1929. In a previous program announcement, the work was called A Faith. Graham presented the piece with her company; the performance marked the debut of her concert ensemble. Heretic is staged for 13 female performers, 12 dressed in black tube-like garments and one in a long white dress. Dancers for the premiere were: Graham, as the woman in white, Kitty Reese, Louise Creston, Irene Emery, Ethel Rudy, Lillian Ray, Hortense Bunsick, Sylvia Wasserstrom, Mary Rivoire, Ruth White, Lillian Shapero, Virginia Briton, Sylvia Rosenstein, Evelyn Sabin, Betty Macdonald and Rosina Savelli.

== Theme and structure ==
The ballet is approximately five minutes long. The music consists of ten percussive bars, a verse and chorus, repeated seven times. It begins with a harsh, martial-sounding chord, which then subsides into the simple melody. As the scene opens, the women in black are arranged in a semi-circle angled inward toward center stage. They stand shoulder to shoulder, arms folded, legs slightly apart and parallel. Stage left, the woman in white stands alone outside the semicircle, head in profile, hair unbound, facing outward. Seeking welcome or acceptance, she repeatedly approaches the group. Every attempt is met with rejection.

The women in black rearrange themselves into various groupings that prevent the soloist's entry. They move stiff-legged with a thumping heel to toe stride, then stop, legs planted firmly, a stern, monolithic barrier. Arm movements are also wooden and limited, either held akimbo with cupped hands at the hips, kept low in parallel to the thighs or upraised to shoulder height and then sharply folded across the chest. With each rebuff, the woman in white falters and sinks to her knees. After a final failed try, she falls exhausted to lie prone on the stage defeated, her hair covering her face. Her arms flutter once more feebly upward, then drop to remain motionless.

== Critical reception ==
Dance Magazine's reviewer described the action as "the elaboration of stiff-necked recrimination, cruelty and oppression which colored the composition with dread and despair," adding that the dance was "dynamically performed." The New York Telegraph's critic wrote, the work presented "a black circle of relentless figures, toward which an angelic soul draped in white cried and pleaded. As the plea registered with the merciless circle they rose to their fullest height and turned menacingly..." Recalling the work, years later, Graham dancer Bessie Schonberg noted the dance could be interpreted as the contrast between Martha's oeuvre and tradition. In his memoir, Stuart Hodes described the piece as possibly "a metaphor for Martha's life - one against many - her role in the world, in dance, in her troupe, and likely, in her own family."

== Revivals ==
Heretic was performed from 1929 through 1931, then disappeared from the Martha Graham Dance Company repertory. In 1986, the troupe's 60th anniversary year, Graham agreed to reprise some of her very early pieces, Heretic among them. Takako Asakawa performed Graham's solo role in the dance. The ensemble members were Thea Nerissa Barnes, Kathy Buccellato, Jacqulyn Buglisi, Judith Garay, Sophie Giavanola, Joyce Herring, Debra Kantor, Theresa Maldonado, Maxine Sherman, Kim Stroud and Denise Vale. The New York Times critic wrote that Asakawa's savagely tortured performance set against the implacable strength of the ensemble" was "so stunning the audience itself is stunned."

The ballet has been performed occasionally since its revival. In 2003, Fang-Yi Sheu took on the solo role. The piece has also been staged by college dance troupes under the auspices of the Martha Graham Dance Company. In 2018, the Graham Company authorized a new staging at the Cultural Arts Center in Columbus, in honor of a retrospective exhibition by photographer and longtime Graham collaborator Soichi Sunami, who produced the first photographic images of the dance. The staging was under the direction of former Graham principal dancer Miki Orihara, and performed by the Columbus Modern Dance Company (CoMo Dance), with CoMo director and founder Laura Puscas in the lead role.
