= Adolescence (disambiguation) =

Adolescence is the human transition from puberty to adult.

Adolescence may also refer to:

- Adolescence (ballet)
- Adolescence (EP), a 2015 EP by Gnarwolves
- Adolescence (film) (1966), French short documentary film
- Adolescence (mixtape), a 2021 mixtape by Unknown T
- Adolescence (TV series) (2025), British drama miniseries
