= James P. Clarke (composer) =

Canadian organist, conductor and composer

James Paton Clarke (1807/08–1877) was a Canadian organist, conductor and composer. He was the first person to receive a bachelor's degree in music in North America. He is best known for his work Lays of the Maple Leaf (1853) and for leading several of Toronto's earliest musical organizations.

== Early life ==
Clarke was born in Edinburgh, Scotland. As a young man he worked as music dealer's assistant in Edinburgh and led the singing of psalms in St George's Church in Glasgow.

== Career ==
Clarke emigrated to Canada in 1835, taking a job as the organist for St. James Cathedral in York (Toronto). In 1844 he became the organist for Christ Church in Hamilton.

Clarke received his bachelor's degree in music from the Kings College (later University of Toronto) in 1846.

Clarke was the first conductor of the Toronto Choral Society, which was founded in 1845. He was a composer of choral music; a collection of his songs about the Canadian landscape, Lays of the Maple Leaf, was published in 1853 by A. & S. Nordheimer.

Clarke constructed a new kind of organ for which the pipes were made of glass.

In 1872 Clarke became the conductor of the Toronto Philharmonic Society.

Clarke taught organ and piano; one of his pupils was his son Hugh, who became a professor of music at the University of Pennsylvania.

== Works ==
- Lays of the Maple Leaf (1853)
