= Erina Yashima =

German musical conductor

- Born: 1986 (age 39–40); Heilbronn, West Germany
- Occupation: Conductor

Erina Yashima (born 1986) is a German conductor. She is currently assistant conductor of the Philadelphia Orchestra.

Yashima was born in Heilbronn, West Germany, to Japanese immigrants. She received her first lesson in conducting at the age of 14, while studying under Bernd Goetzke at the Institute for the Early Advancement of the Musically Highly Gifted, a program of the Hanover University of Music, Drama and Media. She then studied at the Hochschule für Musik "Hanns Eisler" in Berlin.

In February 2016, she became the Sir Georg Solti Conducting Apprentice at the Chicago Symphony Orchestra, working with music director Riccardo Muti for three seasons before joining the Philadelphia Orchestra in April 2019.
