= Bessie Schonberg =

German-born dancer and choreographer

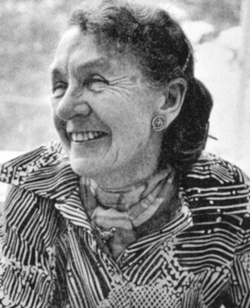
- Born: December 27, 1906; Hanover, Germany
- Died: May 14, 1997 (aged 90); New York City, United States

Bessie Schonberg (December 27, 1906 – May 14, 1997) was a highly influential dancer, choreographer and teacher of the 20th century. She was at the center of contemporary modern dance from her beginning at Bennington College up until her death in 1997. Her career spanned sixty-five years and she helped mold a new generation of modern dancers including Lucinda Childs, Elizabeth Keen, Meredith Monk and Carolyn Adams (dancer).

Capturing a sense of the life and work of Bessie Schonberg is possible if one evokes the image of a prism, a multi-face crystalline object which cannot be perceived in its entirety, but can be appreciated and understood by catching glimpses of light from its different sides.

== Biography ==
Schonberg, who is known to many dancers simply as "Bessie", grew up in Dresden, Germany. Rose Elizabeth McGrew, her mother, was an American opera singer and as a result, she and her two sisters grew up surrounded by the arts. While in Germany, she began lessons in Dalcroze, a style of rhythmic gymnastics. She fell in love with Dalcroze and to her father's dismay became distracted from her studies. Her father soon ended her lessons and explained to her that dance was "a profession suitable only for the lower class".

When Schonberg emigrated to Eugene, Oregon in 1925, she began her dance studies once again at the University of Oregon where she majored in the fine arts. It was here where she enrolled in her first dance course. Lillian Stupp, her first dance teacher, left the University of Oregon in 1927 and was replaced with Martha Hill. Hill, knowledgeable and highly experienced in dance, gave Schonberg the direction and skills she had been yearning for. Hill introduced her to the world of dance in New York City and to one of the best known modern dancers of all time, Martha Graham. After studying with Hill for two years, Schonberg decided to discontinue her studies and pursue her dance career in New York City.

Schonberg arrived in NYC at a pivotal time for modern dance in the United States. A new generation of modern dancers such as Graham, Schonberg, Doris Humphrey, and Helen Tamiris helped solidify modern dance in the 1920s. These second generation modern dancers yearned to create expressive movement free of the confines of traditional ballet. Schonberg and Graham collaborated for two years and she performed in some of Graham's best known works, including Heretic and Primitive Mysteries.

In 1931 however, a knee injury forced Schonberg to stop performing. This small obstacle did not prevent her from continuing to influence the world of dance. She turned to teaching and earned her Bachelor of Arts degree from Bennington College in 1936. In 1938 she became the director of theater and dance at Sarah Lawrence College and stayed there until 1975. At Sarah Lawrence she created one of the first dance departments in American higher education. Sarah Lawrence's dance department served as a model from which other college dance departments grew. She also served as the choreographic advisor at the YARD on Martha's Vineyard - one of the nation's first residential retreats for young choreographers [www.DanceTheYard.org], taught at the Juilliard School, and conducted workshops at Dance Theater Workshop and New York University's Tisch School of the Arts.

Bessie Schonberg continued to teach in New York until her death in 1997. On the day of her death she was scheduled to teach a class at Juilliard.

== Major works ==
Although Schonberg is well known in the dance world, many people might not be aware of her and her achievements because she mostly worked behind the scenes as an educator. Also, due to her injury at a young age she did not appear in many works other than Heretic and Primitive Mysteries. She did however hold an annual choreography workshop at Jacob's Pillow where she showcased some of her original choreography.

== Teaching methodologies ==
Although Schonberg admired Isadora Duncan and other founding members of the modern era, she favored movement that required more discipline and had a heavier feel. She was trained in Graham technique but did not associate herself with one specific style of modern dance. As a choreographer and teacher, she made her dancers explore the ideas of gravity, space, time and rhythm. She would also give her dancers complex problems which they would have to solve through movement; she believed that this kind of teaching method bred creative and open-minded movers.

Schonberg used different teaching methodologies throughout her career as a dance educator. She paralleled her pedagogical styles closely with that of Martha Hill, her primary dance teacher. She believed however that her approach to dance and choreograph education really stemmed from her "sustained interaction with her students". She claims that most of what [she] learned about teaching [her] students taught [her]".

== Legacy ==
The "Bessie" – the New York Dance and Performance Award – is one of the most prestigious awards one can receive in the world of dance. These awards were given out from 1984-2008 by the Dance Theater Workshop, and starting in 2009 by Dance/NYC to choreographers or dancers who receive "outstanding artistic achievement in the field of contemporary dance performance".

== Awards ==
- New York State Governor's Award for the Arts (1989)
- National Endowment for the Arts selected her as the first recipient for the Teacher/Mentor Fellowship award for lifetime achievement (1993)
- Erine Award (1994)

Schonberg was slated to receive the American Dance Festival's Balasaraswati/Joy Ann Dewey Beinecke Endowed Chair for Distinguished Teaching but died before she was able to receive it.
