= Stefan Weisman =

American classical composer

Stefan Weisman is an American composer of contemporary classical music. He composes opera, chamber music, orchestral music, as well as music for the theater, video and dance.

His opera Darkling, with a libretto by Anna Rabinowitz was commissioned, developed and produced in 2006 by American Opera Projects. Elements of composer Lee Hoiby’s song “The Darkling Thrush” were used as source material for the opera's music. Darkling was included in the Guggenheim Museum's "Works & Process" series, and premiered at the East 13th Street Theater. In a New York Times review, Anthony Tommasini described Weisman's music as "personal, moody and skillfully wrought." Darkling was released internationally by Albany Records in 2011. Of the CD, Gramophone Magazine wrote: “Weisman unfolds his emotional tapestry with confident strokes…resulting in something resembling a high-art radio drama.”

Weisman's opera Fade, with a libretto by David Cote, was commissioned and produced in 2008 by Second Movement Opera.

Weisman was a resident artist at the HERE Arts Center, where he developed an opera with Cote, based on the short story "The Scarlet Ibis" by author James Hurst. The Scarlet Ibis debuted in the Prototype Festival, co-produced by HERE and Beth Morrison Projects. The New York Times praised The Scarlet Ibis as an “outstanding new chamber musical” and The Wall Street Journal called it “subtly subversive, and its production groundbreaking.”

He was a recipient of a commission from Bang on a Can, and his music has also been performed by the Miró Quartet, Lisa Moore, Anthony Roth Costanzo, and Newspeak. He wrote the music for the play Calabi-Yau. In 2012, when his song "Twinkie" was featured on the nationally syndicated program The Wendy Williams Show, the host said, "Very unique...You're not going to hear opera like this anywhere else...Fabulous!"

He studied composition at Bard College with Joan Tower and Daron Hagen, and at Yale University with David Lang, Jacob Druckman, Ezra Laderman and Martin Bresnick. He earned a Ph.D. from Princeton University in 2011, where he studied composition with Paul Lansky, Steven Mackey and Barbara White.

Presently, he is a music instructor at Bard High School Early College in Queens, NY. He has also taught at the Princeton University Department of Music, and Juilliard School’s Music Advancement Program, and the City College of New York.

Raised in East Brunswick, New Jersey, Weisman credits his passion for music starting with his participation in the orchestra at East Brunswick High School.

Weisman's aunt is Yiddish actress and singer Goldie Russler.

== Recordings ==
2012: "Stefan Weisman: Darkling" Albany Records

2012: "Newspeak: Sweet Light Crude" New Amsterdam Records

- Includes Stefan Weisman: I Would Prefer Not To

2011: "Jody Redhage: of minutiae & memory" New Amsterdam Records

- Includes Stefan Weisman: Everywhere Feathers
