= Philadelphia Orchestra =

American symphony orchestra

- Orchestra
- Founded: 1900; 126 years ago
- Location: Broad and Locust Streets, Philadelphia, Pennsylvania, U.S.
- Concert hall: Kimmel Center for the Performing Arts
- Music director: Yannick Nézet-Séguin
- Website: philorch.org

The Philadelphia Orchestra is an American symphony orchestra based in the Center City district of Philadelphia, Pennsylvania, United States. One of the "Big Five" American orchestras, the orchestra is based at the Kimmel Center for the Performing Arts, where it performs its subscription concerts, numbering over 130 annually, at Marian Anderson Hall (formerly Verizon Hall).

From its founding until 2001, the Philadelphia Orchestra gave its concerts at the Academy of Music. The orchestra continues to own the academy, and returns there one week per year for the Academy of Music's annual gala concert and concerts for school children. The Philadelphia Orchestra's summer home is the Mann Center for the Performing Arts. It also has summer residencies at the Saratoga Performing Arts Center, and since July 2007 at the Bravo! Vail Valley Festival in Vail, Colorado. The orchestra also performs an annual series of concerts at Carnegie Hall. From its earliest days the orchestra has been active in the recording studio, primarily for RCA Victor and Columbia Records.

Yannick Nézet-Séguin has been serving as the orchestra's music director since 2012. Matías Tarnopolsky was appointed president and CEO in August 2018.

== History ==
=== 20th century ===
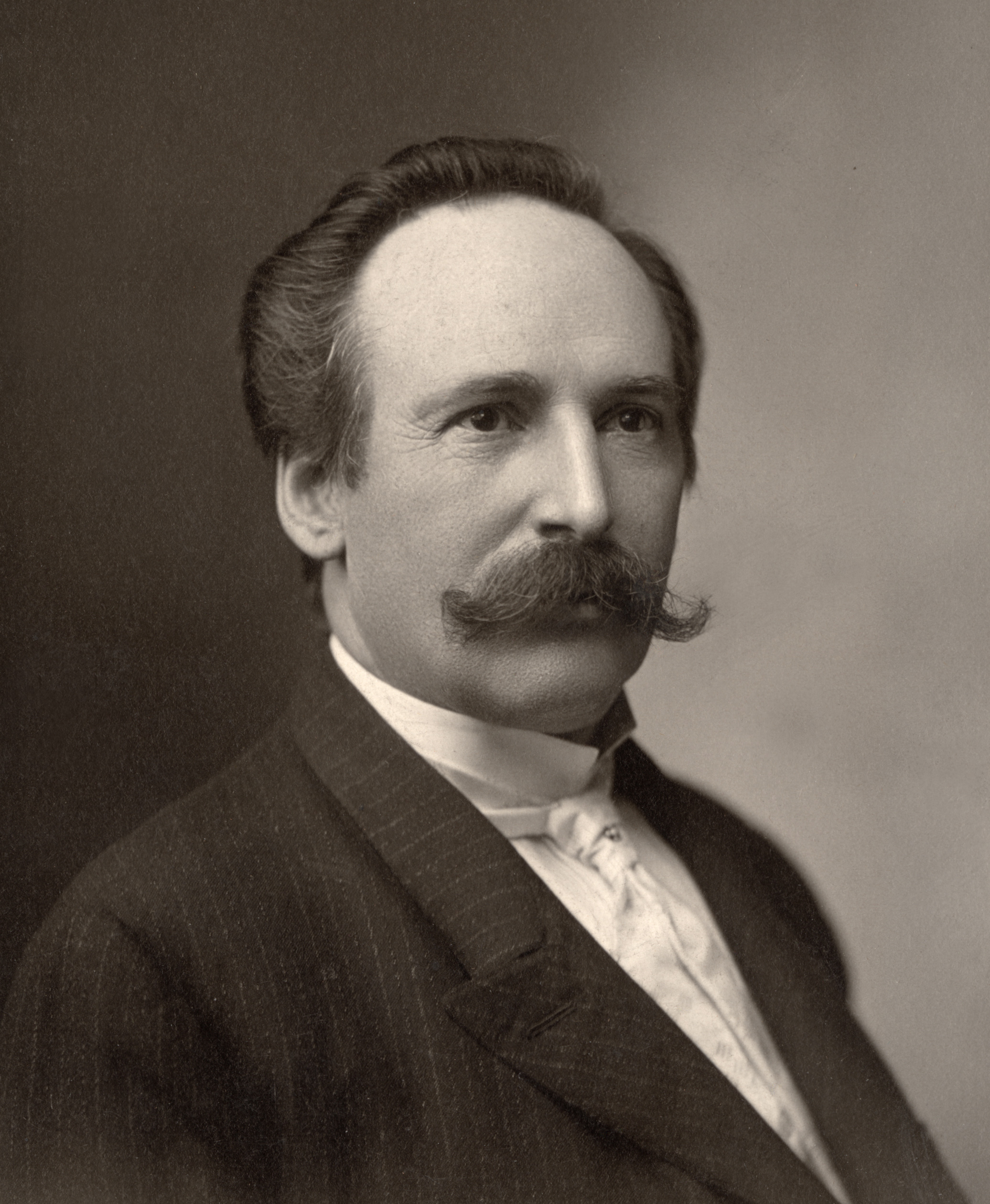
Fritz Scheel, founding father and first conductor of the Philadelphia Orchestra

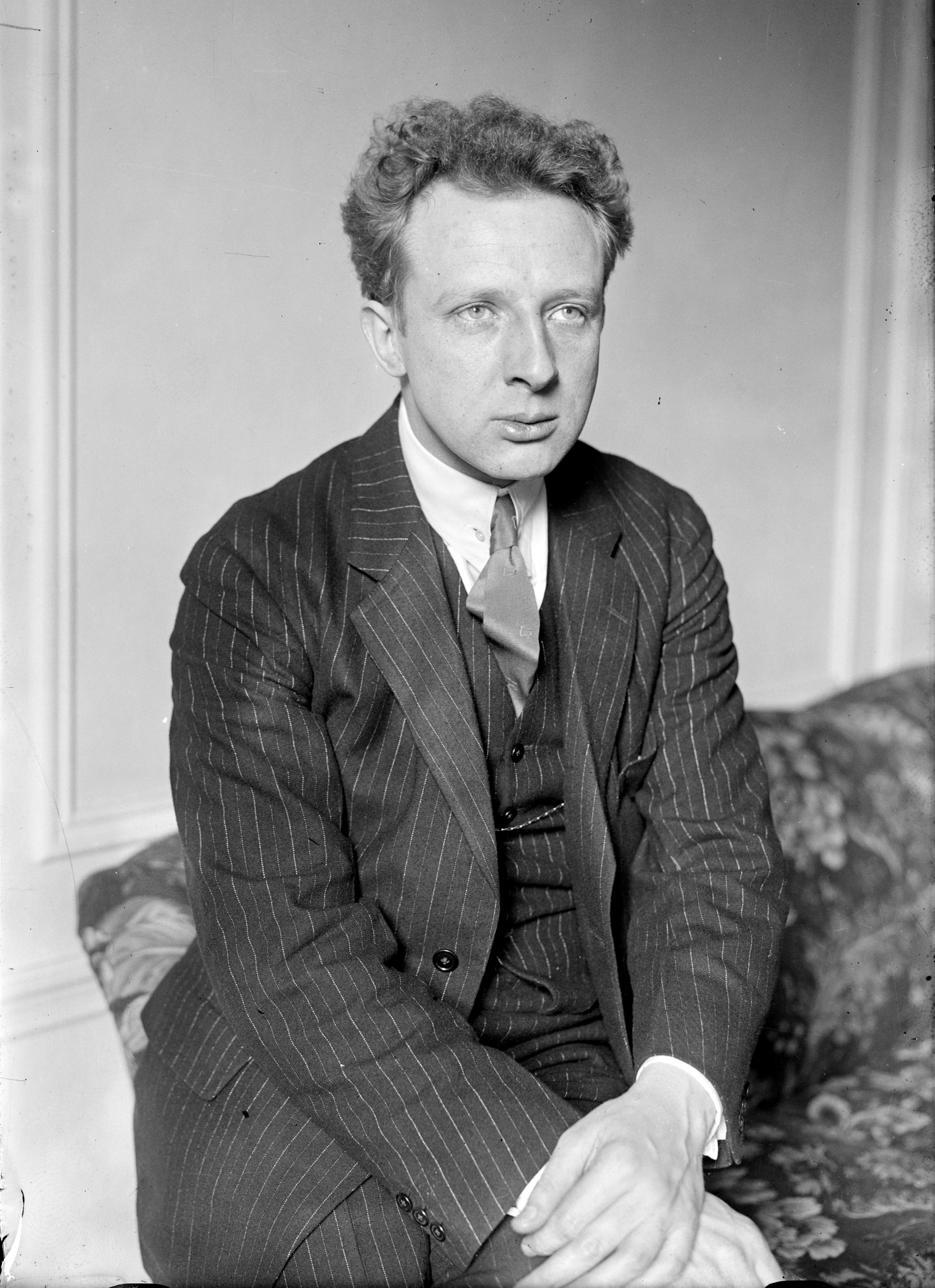
Leopold Stokowski, the Philadelphia Orchestra's music director from 1912 to 1938

The Philadelphia Orchestra was founded in 1900 by Fritz Scheel, who also acted as its first conductor. The orchestra had its beginnings with a small group of musicians led by the pianist F. Cresson Schell (1857–1942). John Marquardt was the orchestra's concertmaster in 1902–1903. In 1904, Richard Strauss guest conducted the orchestra in a program of his compositions, and in 1906 the Polish pianist Arthur Rubinstein made his American debut with the orchestra. Additionally in 1906, the orchestra traveled to the White House to perform in a concert.

In February 1907, Leandro Campanari took over and served as interim conductor for a short time during Scheel's illness and after his death. A flutist in the orchestra, August Rodemann, stood in before Campanari's arrival. He started sabotaging the performances and Campanari was obliged to remove himself from a bad situation.

In 1907, Karl Pohlig became music director and served until 1912. New music he programmed was unpopular with audiences, and revelations that he had an extra-marital affair with his secretary caused outrage. The orchestra cancelled his contract and gave him a year's salary ($12,000) in severance to avoid a suit from Pohlig alleging a conspiracy to oust him.

Leopold Stokowski became music director in 1912, and brought the orchestra to national prominence. Before Stokowski's arrival, the orchestra was modeled after European standards, much like other major United States orchestras at the time. Stokowski and the orchestra were one of the first to break free from this, and together they created a new sound that is still respected and mimicked today. Under his guidance, the orchestra gained a reputation for their richness, strength, virtuosity, and blend, particularly in the strings. Stokowski was able to achieve this through free bowing along with his unique baton-less conducting style. He was also the first to implement the seating plan used by the majority of orchestras today. These characteristics became known as the "Philadelphia Sound." Stokowski left the orchestra in 1941, and did not return as a guest conductor for nearly 20 years.

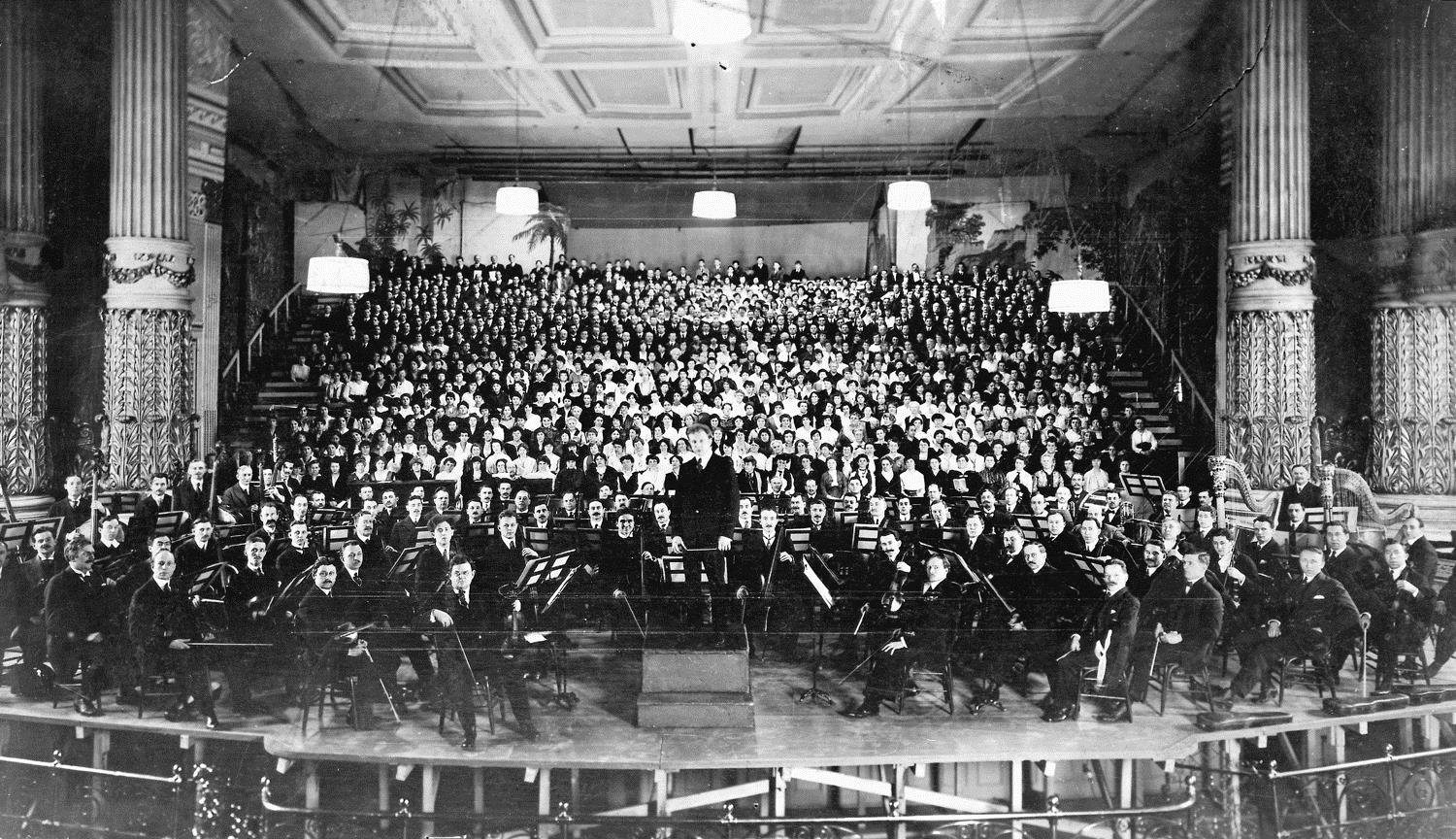
The Philadelphia Orchestra on stage with Stokowski for the American premiere of Mahler's Eighth Symphony in March 1916

In 1936, Eugene Ormandy joined the organization, and jointly held the post of principal conductor with Stokowski until 1938 when he became its sole music director. He remained as music director until 1980, after which he became conductor laureate. Ormandy conducted many of the orchestra's best-known recordings and took the orchestra on its historic 1973 tour of the People's Republic of China, making it the first Western orchestra to visit the country. The tour was highly successful, and it has since returned for thirteen additional successful tours.

Riccardo Muti became principal guest conductor of the orchestra in the 1970s, and assumed the role as music director from Ormandy in 1980, serving through 1992. His recordings with the orchestra included the symphonies of Ludwig van Beethoven, Johannes Brahms, and Alexander Scriabin, for the EMI and Philips labels.

Wolfgang Sawallisch succeeded Muti as music director from 1993 to 2003. He made a number of recordings with the orchestra of music of Robert Schumann, Richard Strauss and Richard Wagner, among other composers, for the EMI label. However, the orchestra lost its recording contract with EMI during this time, which led to a musicians' strike for 64 days in 1996. Near the end of Sawallisch's tenure, the orchestra released a self-produced set of recordings of the Schumann symphonies with Sawallisch conducting. In 2003, Sawallisch was named conductor laureate, and held the title until his death in 2013.

=== 21st century ===
In 2003, Christoph Eschenbach succeeded Sawallisch as music director. This appointment was controversial because Eschenbach had not conducted the orchestra in over four years and there was a perceived lack of personal chemistry between him and the musicians prior to the appointment. At least one early report tried to downplay this concern. The orchestra returned to commercial recordings with Eschenbach, on the Ondine label. In October 2006, Eschenbach and the orchestra announced that his tenure as music director would end in 2008. Eschenbach's total of five years as music director equalled Pohlig's as the shortest in the history of the Philadelphia Orchestra.

After Eschenbach's departure, the Philadelphia Orchestra did not name a music director for four years. In February 2007, Charles Dutoit was appointed chief conductor and artistic adviser for four seasons, starting in the fall of 2008 and running through the 2011–2012 season. This move was made to provide an "artistic bridge" while the orchestra searched for its eighth music director. According to news articles from August 2007, the orchestra had devised a search process in which each musician in the orchestra would have a say in the choice of the next music director.

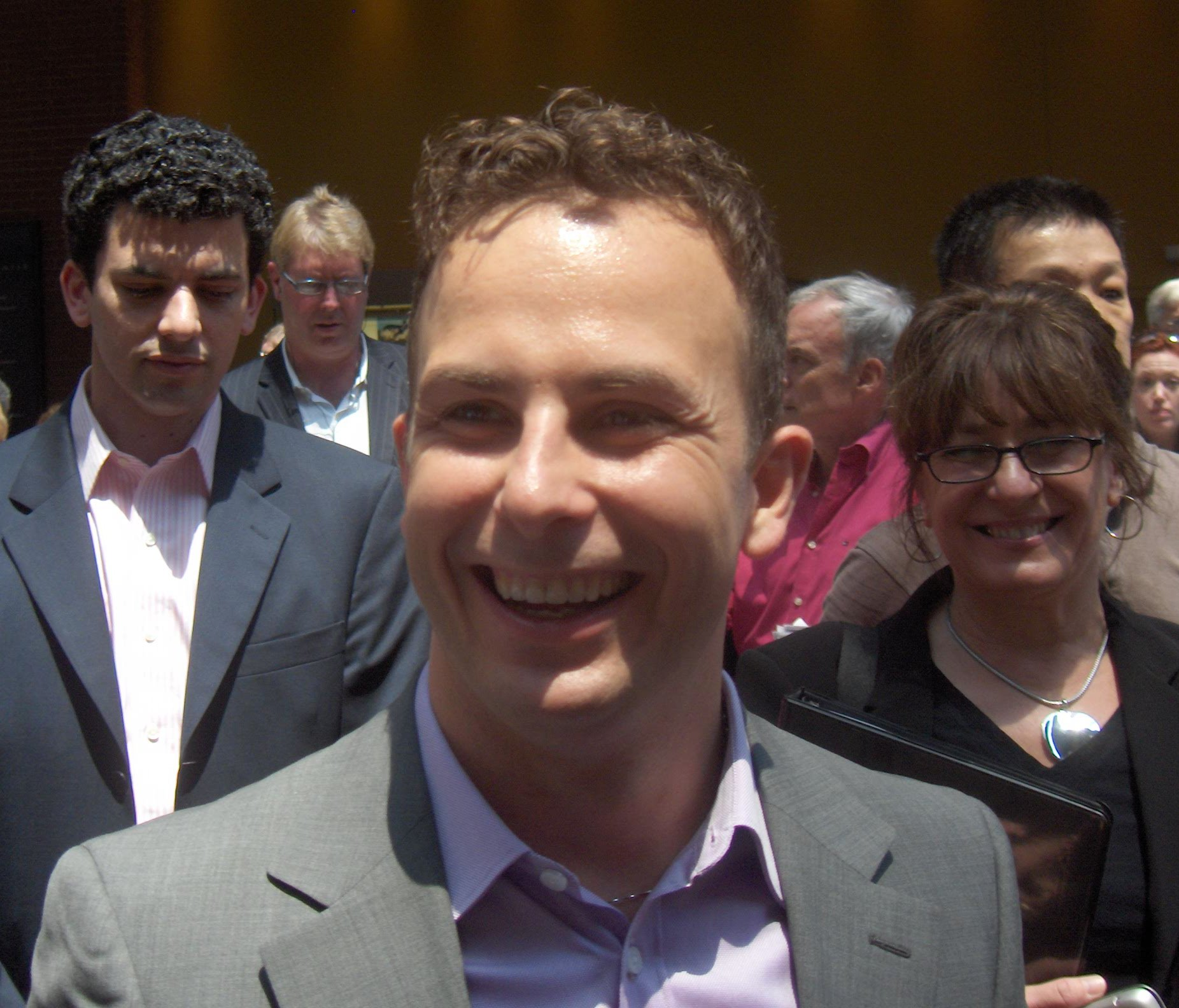
Yannick Nézet-Séguin, principal conductor from 2012.

In December 2008, at the invitation of Dutoit, Yannick Nézet-Séguin made his first guest-conducting appearance with the orchestra. He returned for a second series of concerts in December 2009. In June 2010, Nézet-Séguin was appointed music director designate, with a scheduled duration under that title from 2010 to 2012, with 2 weeks of scheduled appearances in the 2010–2011 season, and 5 weeks of scheduled appearances in the 2011–2012 season. In 2012, he was appointed music director; Dutoit was named conductor laureate. Nézet-Séguin's initial contract as music director was for 5 seasons, with 7 weeks of scheduled concerts in the 2012–2012 season, 15 weeks in the next 2 seasons, and 16 weeks in the subsequent 2 seasons of his Philadelphia contract. In January 2015, the orchestra announced the extension of Nézet-Séguin's contract to the 2021–22 season. In June 2016, the orchestra announced a further extension of Nézet-Séguin's contract through the 2025–2026 season. In December 2017, the orchestra announced the immediate discontinuation of its relationship with Dutoit and the revocation of his title as its conductor laureate, in the wake of sexual assault allegations against him.

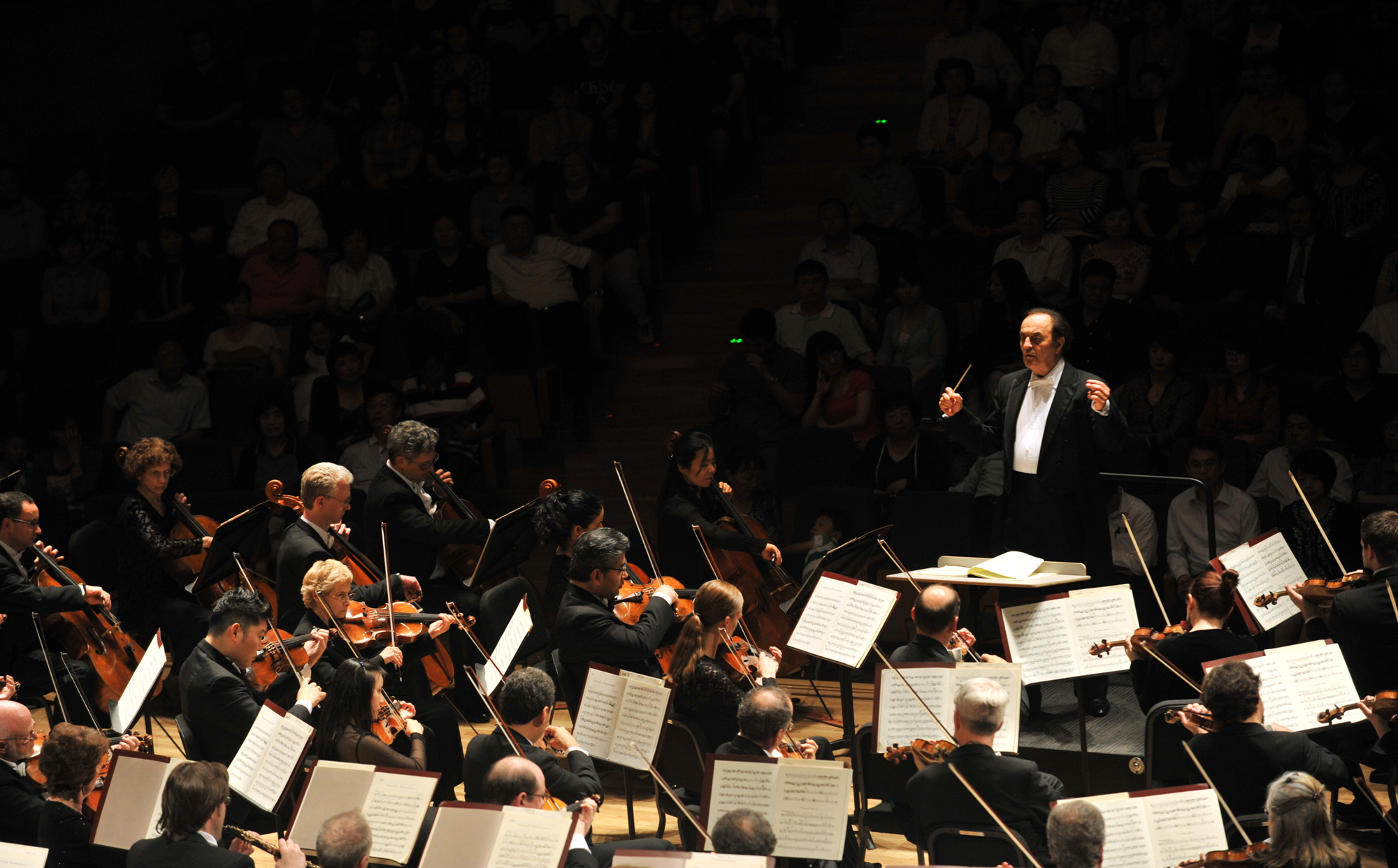
Charles Dutoit and the Philadelphia Orchestra concert in Tianjin

The Philadelphia Orchestra's current concertmaster is David Kim. Past concertmasters have included Norman Carol and Erez Ofer. Past Associate Conductors of the orchestra have included William Smith, Luis Biava, and Rossen Milanov. In 2014, Stéphane Denève was appointed principal guest conductor, Cristian Măcelaru as conductor-in-residence, and Lio Kuokman as assistant conductor. In 2016, Kensho Watanabe succeeded Kuokman as assistant conductor. Erina Yashima has served as assistant conductor since 2019. Denève served as principal guest conductor from 2014 through 2020.

As of June 2016, the orchestra does not have its own chorus. The orchestra formerly worked with the Philadelphia Singers as its resident chorus until the Philadelphia Singers disbanded in May 2015.

=== Bankruptcy and industrial action ===
On April 16, 2011, the Philadelphia Orchestra's board of directors voted to file for Chapter 11 reorganization due to the organization's large operational deficit. This was the first time that a major U.S. orchestra had filed for bankruptcy. Amid mounting dissent from the musicians, Nézet-Séguin volunteered in August 2011 to add a week in his 2011–2012 season appearances. On July 30, 2012, the orchestra announced that it had officially emerged from Chapter 11 bankruptcy protection, effective that day.

On September 30, 2016, the orchestra's players went out on strike, one hour before its scheduled Opening Night Gala concert. The musicians issued a statement: 'We can no longer remain silent while we continue in a downward spiral.' The players rejected 1–2 percent per year increases offered by management. The base pay rate was noted as less than what other similar orchestras are offering. The strike was settled after three days when musicians approved a new contract on October 2, 2016. The new agreement is scheduled to raise the base salary to $137,800 and to increase the size of the orchestra to 97 over three years.

=== Recent history ===
In March 2018, the orchestra announced the appointment of Matías Tarnopolsky as its next president and chief executive officer, in succession to Allison Vulgamore, who held the posts from 2010 through December 2017. In December 2020, the orchestra announced the appointment of Nathalie Stutzmann as its next principal guest conductor, the first female conductor ever named to this Philadelphia post, effective with the 2021–2022 season, with a contract of 3 years. In February 2023, the orchestra announced a further extension of Nézet-Séguin's contract, through the 2029–2030 season, along with a change in his title to music and artistic director. In January 2024, the orchestra announced the appointment of Marin Alsop as its next principal guest conductor, effective with the 2024–2025 season, with an initial contract of 3 seasons. In December 2024, the orchestra announced that Tarnopolsky is to stand down as its president and chief executive officer at the close of 2024.

In April 2025, the orchestra announced the appointment of Ryan Fleur as its new president and chief executive officer (CEO), with immediate effect. Fleur had served as the orchestra's interim president and CEO since the departure of Tarnopolsky.

=== Firsts ===
The Philadelphia Orchestra boasts a number of significant media firsts. It was the first symphony orchestra to make electrical recordings (in 1925). It was the first orchestra to make a commercially sponsored radio broadcast (on NBC in 1929) and the first to appear on a television broadcast (on CBS in 1948). The Philadelphia was the first American orchestra to make a digital recording of the complete Beethoven symphonies on compact disc (in 1988), and the first major orchestra to give a live cybercast of a concert on the internet (in 1997). In 2006, the orchestra was the first to offer downloads of music from its own website without a distributor.

In other firsts, in 1999, under Wolfgang Sawallisch, it became the first American orchestra to visit Vietnam. In 2006, the orchestra appointed Carol Jantsch principal tuba as of 2006–2007, the orchestra's first ever female principal tuba player and the first in a full-time American orchestra.

=== Rachmaninoff ===
The orchestra was known for its special relationship with the composer Sergei Rachmaninoff, due primarily to Stokowski's championship. In his first season, on January 3, 1913, Stokowski conducted Isle of the Dead. Later, in an all-Rachmaninoff programme on February 3, 1920, Stokowski gave the U.S. premiere of The Bells and accompanied the composer in his 3rd Piano Concerto. In 1924 they collaborated on an acoustically recorded 78 rpm set of the 2nd Piano Concerto, re-recording it electrically in 1929. On March 18, 1927, Stokowski conducted the world premieres of the Three Russian Folk Songs, of which he was the dedicatee, and the 4th Piano Concerto, again with the composer at the keyboard. Another world premiere took place on November 7, 1934, when Stokowski conducted the composer in the Rhapsody on a Theme of Paganini, with the two musicians making its first recording shortly afterwards.

Rachmaninoff himself also took on the role of conductor with the Philadelphia Orchestra, recording Isle of the Dead and Vocalise with them in 1929, followed ten years later by a 78 rpm set of his 3rd Symphony, a work that Stokowski had premiered on November 6, 1936. In particular, he and Ormandy were also close associates and Rachmaninoff was supposed to have said that in his American years he composed with the sound of the Philadelphia Orchestra in his head. The many recordings of the music of Rachmaninoff by Ormandy were noted as being closest to the composer's desire. Rachmaninoff's Symphonic Dances, Op. 45, his last work, was premiered by Ormandy and the Philadelphia Orchestra, to whom it is dedicated, on January 3, 1941.

=== Role in U.S.-China relations ===
The orchestra has played an important role in U.S.-China relations. It made diplomatic history in 1973 when it became the first American orchestra to tour the People's Republic of China, performing in Beijing's Great Hall of the People and Shanghai. It has since returned 12 times, a decision that orchestra president and CEO Matías Tarnopolsky described in a November 2023 New York Times opinion piece as "not a signal of approval of China's policies but rather, "our journeys to China signify a belief in the possibility of change through dialogue." In November 2023, as part of the U.S. State Department's Global Music Diplomacy Initiative and ahead of Chinese president Xi Jinping and US president Joe Biden's meeting on the sidelines of the APEC summit in San Francisco, 14 musicians traveled to China for a series of performances amid a low point in US-China relations, recognizing the 50th anniversary of the orchestra's cultural exchanges with China, winning praise from both Biden and Xi for its use of music diplomacy in improving bilateral relations. U.S. ambassador to China R. Nicholas Burns described the visit as "a very important" and "perfectly timed event," noting that it "turned the page" on a four-year period of cultural disengagement between the American and the Chinese people caused by the COVID-19 pandemic.

== Discography ==
=== Studio albums ===
Title	Album details
David Bowie Narrates Prokofiev's Peter and the Wolf (with David Bowie)	Release date: May 2, 1978; Label: RCA Red Seal

== Recordings ==
The orchestra's first recordings were made for the Victor Talking Machine Company in Camden, New Jersey, in 1917, when Leopold Stokowski conducted performances of two of Brahms's Hungarian Dances. The historic first electrical recordings were also made at Victor's Trinity Church Studio in Camden, in April 1925; Saint-Saëns' Danse macabre was the first to be recorded. Later, in 1926, Victor began recording the orchestra in the Academy of Music in Philadelphia. Stokowski led the ensemble in experimental long-playing, high-fidelity, and even stereophonic sessions in the early 1930s for RCA Victor and Bell Laboratories. During 1939–40, Stokowski and the orchestra recorded the soundtrack for Walt Disney's Fantasia in multi-track stereophonic sound.

Arturo Toscanini made a series of recordings for RCA Victor with the orchestra in 1941 and 1942; the master discs for these records were supposedly damaged during processing, resulting in unusually high surface noise and distortion and they were not approved for release at the time. In 1963, after extensive electronic editing, RCA Victor issued one of the recordings on LP, Schubert's Symphony No. 9 in C major. In 1977, all of the recordings were finally issued in a 5-LP boxed set; they were later digitally remastered and reissued twice on compact disc by RCA Victor in 1992 and again in 2006.

During the 1942–44 AFM Recording Ban, the orchestra's contract with RCA Victor expired; following the settlement of the strike in November, 1944, the orchestra joined Columbia Records, recording some of the dances from Borodin's Prince Igor. The Philadelphians remained with Columbia for the next 23 years. In 1968, Ormandy and the Philadelphia Orchestra returned to RCA Victor and made their first digital recording, Bartók's Concerto for Orchestra, for the label in 1979. The orchestra has also recorded for EMI and Teldec.

From 1935 to 1976, The Philadelphia Orchestra performed as The Robin Hood Dell Orchestra for a summer concert series held at Robin Hood Dell, an outdoor stage in Fairmount Park. Close to 50 recordings were released under The Robin Hood Dell Orchestra name.

In May 2005, the Philadelphia Orchestra announced a three-year recording partnership with the Finnish label Ondine, the orchestra's first recording contract in 10 years. The resumption of a regular recording program was one of Christoph Eschenbach's stated priorities as music director. Eight recordings were released after November 2005 to largely positive reviews.

On September 21, 2006, the Philadelphia Orchestra became the first major United States orchestra to sell downloads of its performances directly from the orchestra's website. While other American orchestras had downloads of their music on the internet, the Philadelphia Orchestra said it was the first to offer the downloads without a distributor. In 2010, the orchestra abandoned this practice and formed a partnership with IODA, a digital distribution company with downloads available through a variety of online retailers, including iTunes, Amazon.com, Rhapsody, and eMusic.

In other media, musicians from the orchestra were featured in a documentary film by Daniel Anker, Music from the Inside Out, which received theatrical release and television airings.

The orchestra received a Grammy Award in 2022, for their recording of the first and third symphonies of Florence Price.

== Music directors ==
- Fritz Scheel (1900–1907)
- Karl Pohlig (1908–1912)
- Leopold Stokowski (1912–1938)
- Eugene Ormandy (1936–1980)
- Riccardo Muti (1980–1992)
- Wolfgang Sawallisch (1993–2003)
- Christoph Eschenbach (2003–2008)
- Yannick Nézet-Séguin (2012–present)

=== Chief conductors ===
- Charles Dutoit (2008–2012)

== Performance venues ==
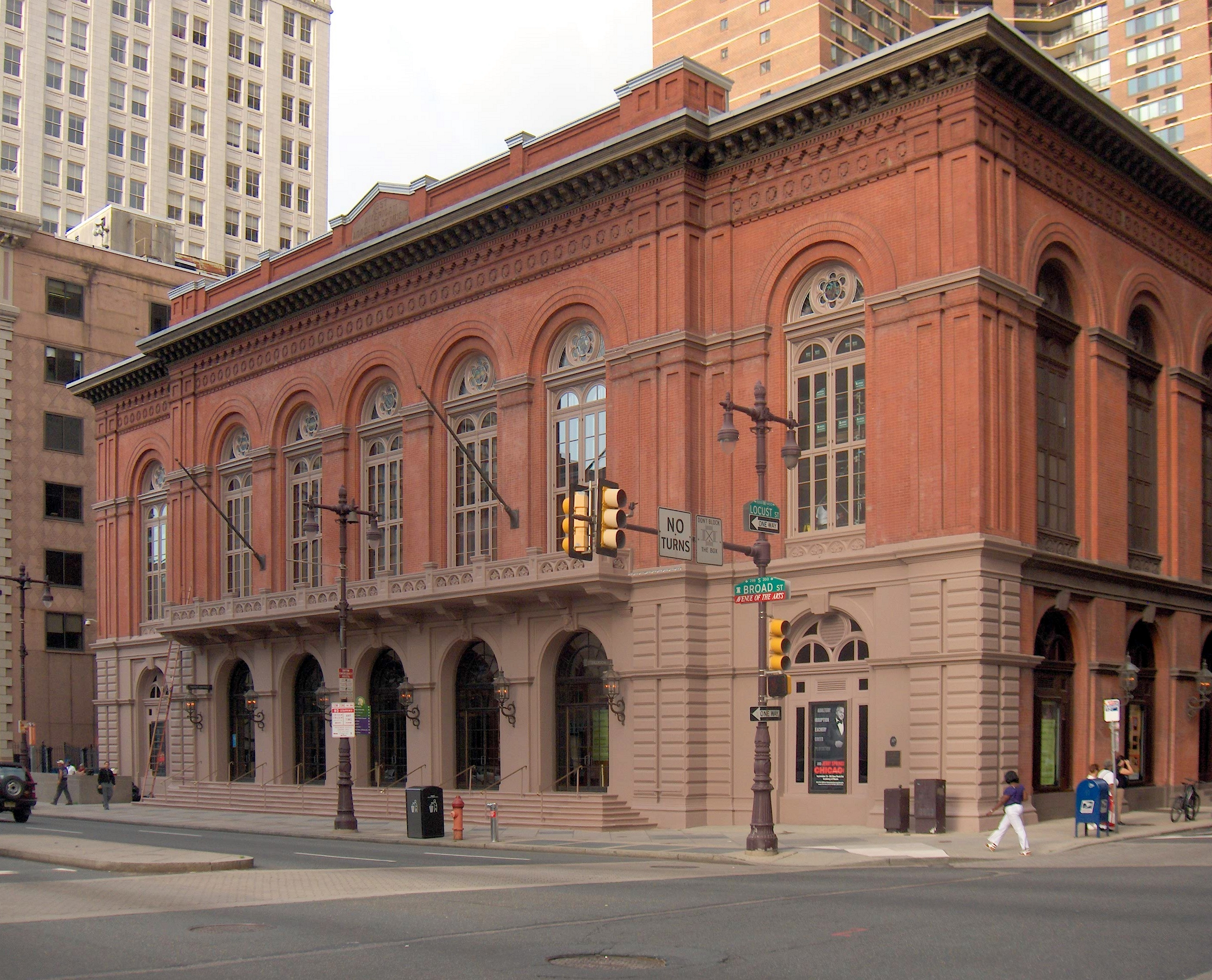
Academy of Music, the orchestra's home, 1900–2001.

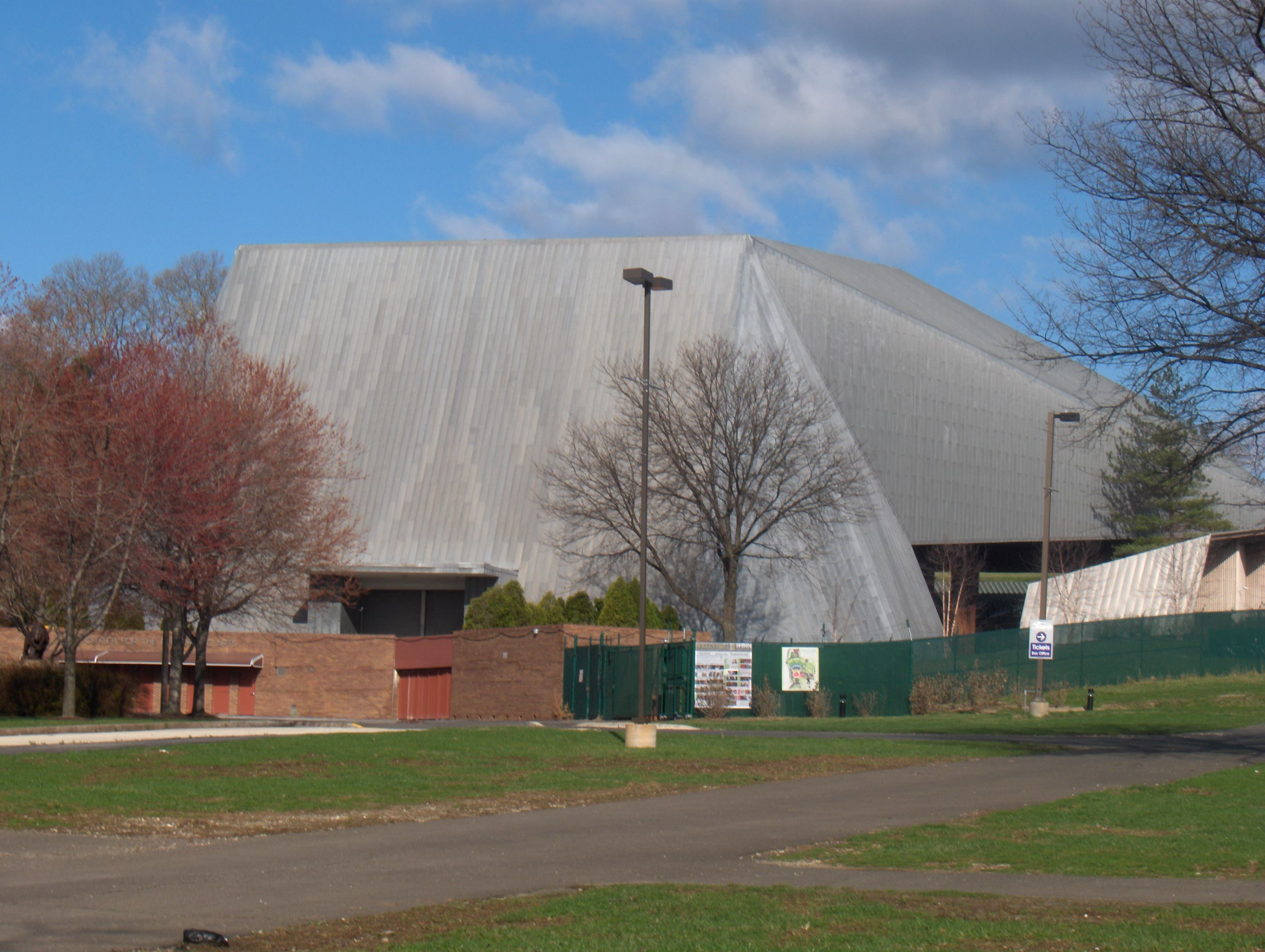
Mann Center for the Performing Arts, the orchestra's summer home since 1976.

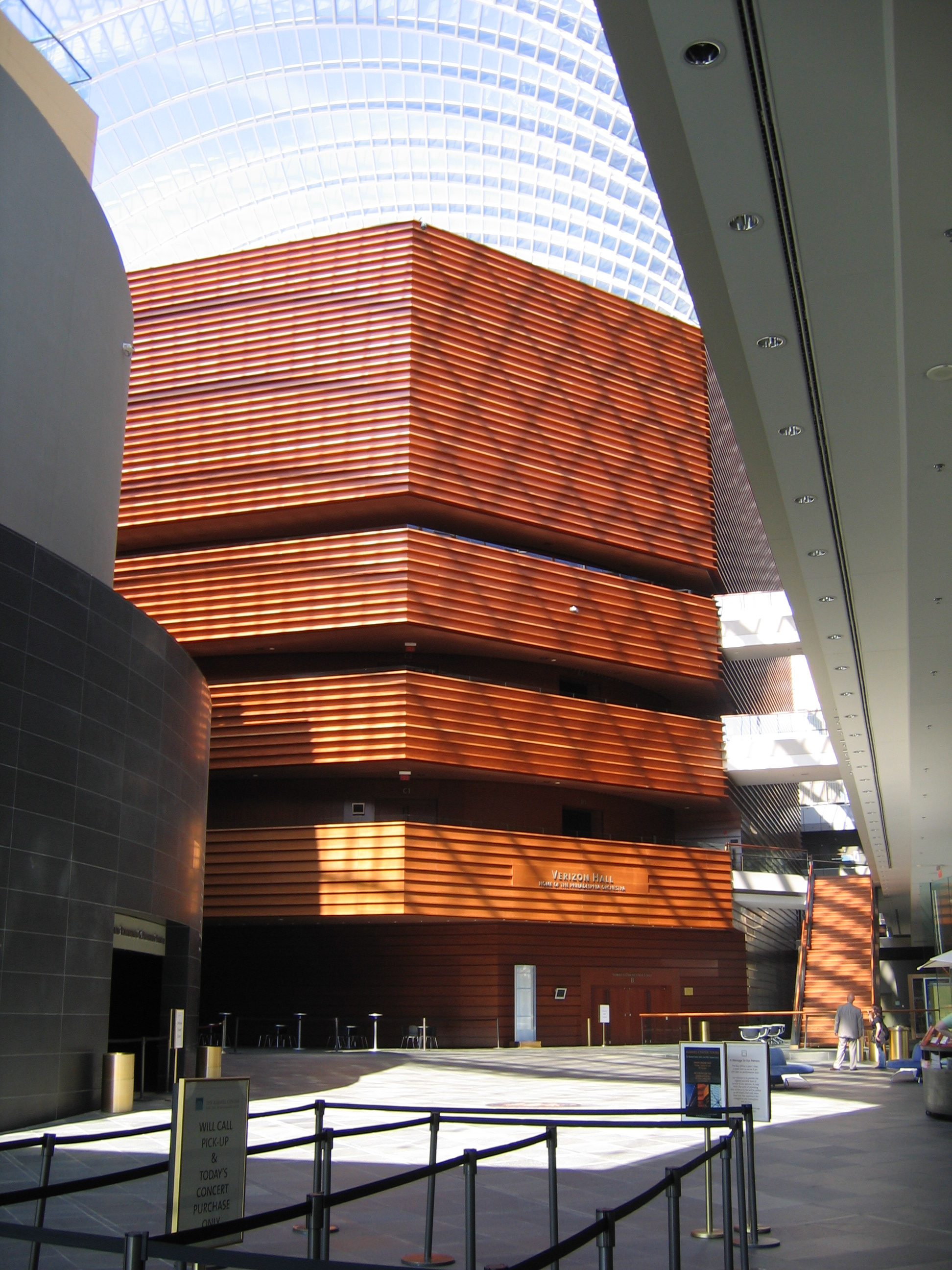
Kimmel Center for the Performing Arts (opened 2001), Marian Anderson Hall is the orchestra's current home.

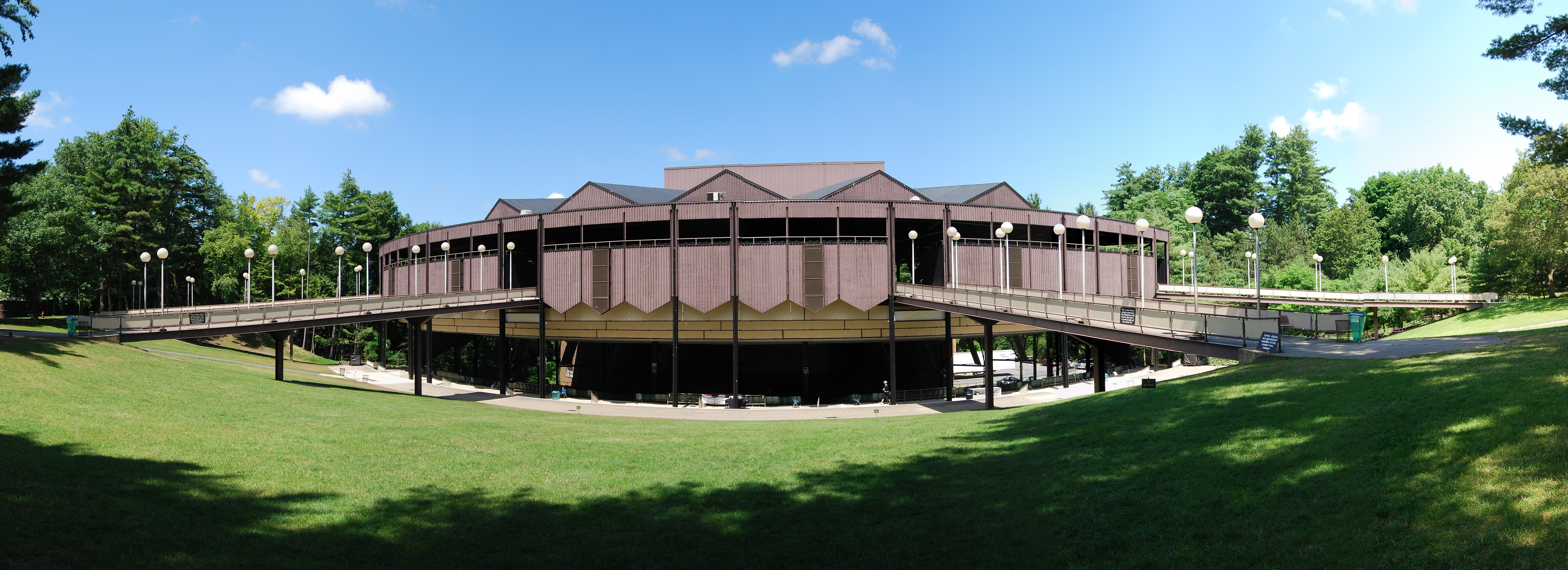
Saratoga Performing Arts Center in Saratoga Springs, New York, the orchestra's summer residency since the venue first opened in 1966.

== See also ==
- Mendelssohn: A Midsummer Night's Dream (Eugene Ormandy recording)
