= Calabi-Yau (play) =

2001 play written by Susanna Speier

Calabi-Yau is a 2001 play written by playwright Susanna Speier with songs and music by Stefan Weisman, based on physicist Brian Greene's national bestseller The Elegant Universe.

The musical play is a multimedia sub-subatomic adventure story about a documentarian lost in an inner loop of an abandoned track of the New York Subway system. He encounters MTA workers who are attempting to prove string theory by building a particle accelerator in abandoned subway tunnels beneath downtown New York City. The MTA track workers lead the documentarian to a gatekeeper named Lucy and her grandfather, who is engineering the particle accelerator. A string explains string theory as a Calabi-Yau tells the story of Alexander the Great cutting the Gordian knot.

It premiered as a workshop production at the Lincoln Center and HERE Arts Center sponsored American Living Room Festival in 2001. Calabi-Yau was produced and performed at HERE in 2002.

Eugenio Calabi and Shing-Tung Yau, for whom Calabi-Yau manifolds are named, attempted to attend the play but were not let in since no one believed they were who they said they were.
