= Fritz Scheel =

German conductor (1852 – 1907)

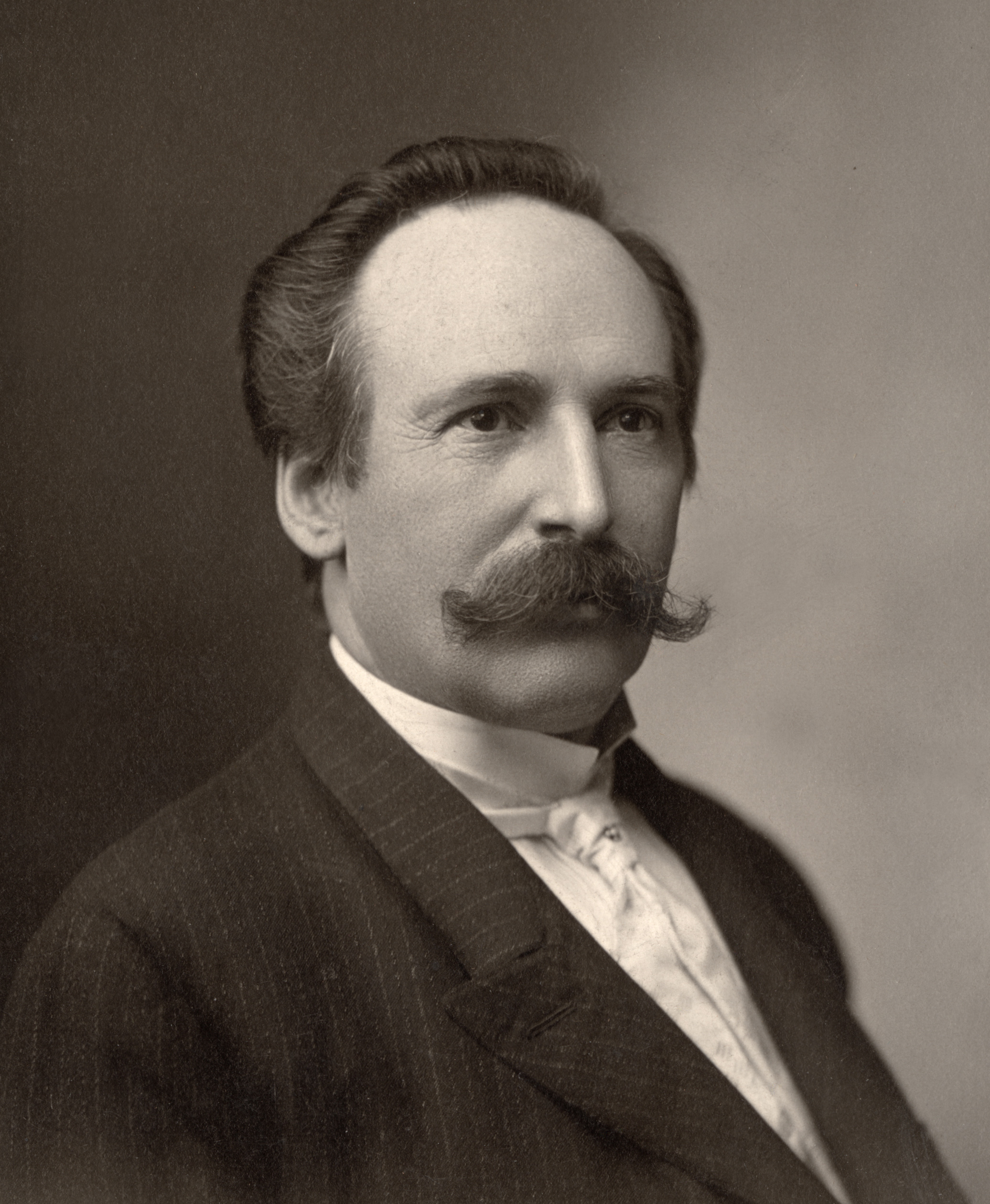
Scheel in the early 1900s

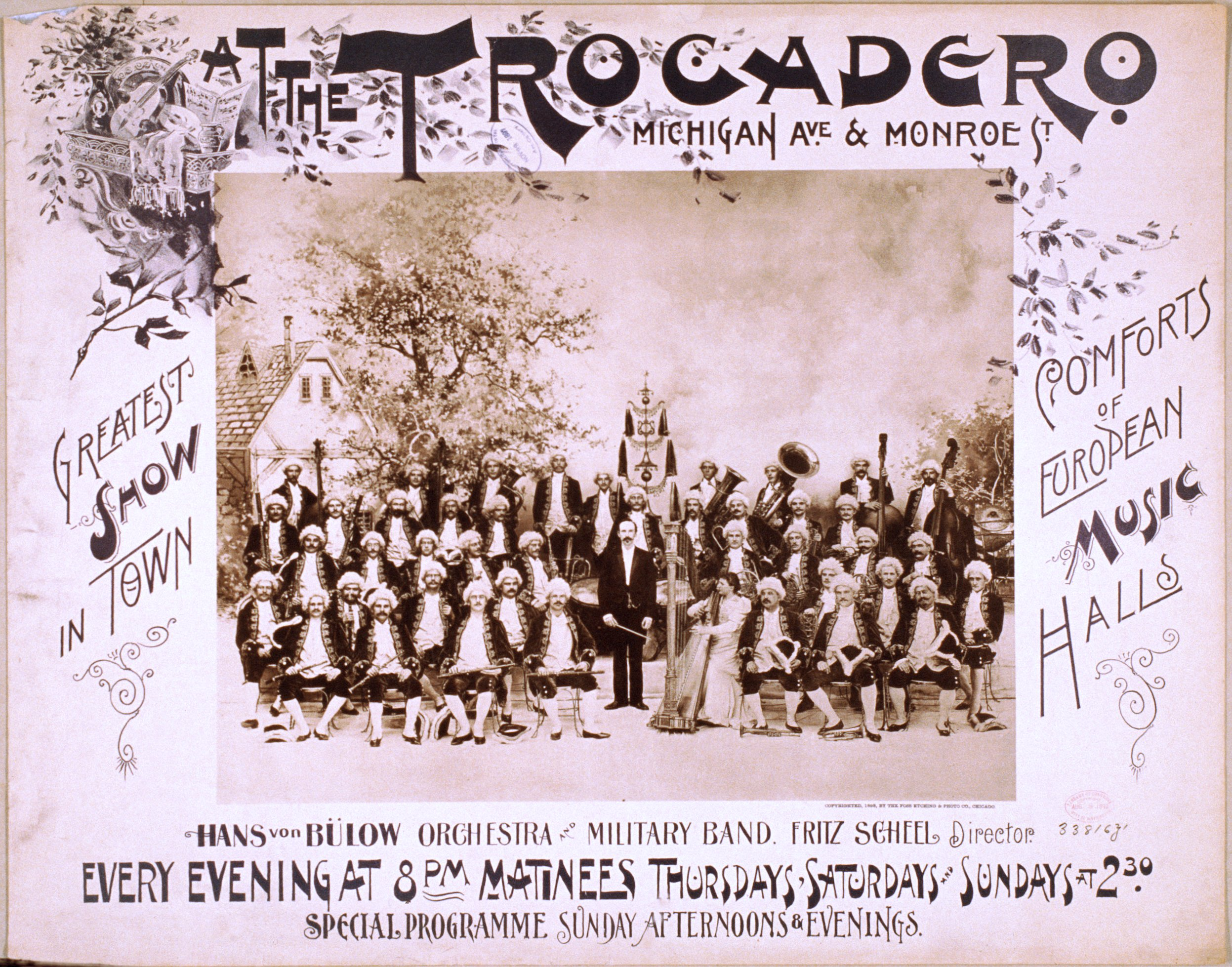

Johann Friedrich Ludwig “Fritz” Scheel (7 November 1852 – 13 March 1907) was a German music conductor and the first musical director of the Philadelphia Orchestra.

He was born in Fackenburg, in present-day Schleswig-Holstein. He emigrated to the United States in early 1893, and conducted concerts in New York City. He was hired to conduct the Trocadero Orchestra at the 1893 World's Columbian Exposition in Chicago, and later assembled a symphony orchestra in San Francisco.

In 1900, Scheel became the first conductor and music director of the newly formed Philadelphia Orchestra. He conducted rehearsals in German, and played mostly German music. After its first season, he fired half the musicians and replaced them with European players.

He was known for his concerts of military music, and one of his trademarks was military attire.

Scheel continued as the Philadelphia Orchestra's music director until his death at age 54, in Philadelphia in 1907. He is buried in West Laurel Hill Cemetery in Bala Cynwyd, Pennsylvania.

A bas-relief portrait in bronze memorial tablet was created by Philadelphia sculptor Charles Grafly, having been commissioned by the Women's Committee for the Philadelphia Orchestra as a tribute to Scheel in 1908.
