= Helen Louise Allen =

American textile historian and collector

Helen Louise Allen (1902 - August 14, 1968) was a nationally known American textile historian and collector. A pioneer in the field of material culture, she was among the first in her area of study to approach textile objects as cultural records through which human nature and history could be better understood.

Allen had a lifelong passion for textiles and weaving techniques that continued from her youth through her career as a university professor, lecturer, and artist. Over time and through extensive travel, she amassed a large collection of approximately 4,000 textile artifacts used to support her teaching and research. Known today as the Helen Louise Allen Textile Collection, her work continues to be used by students and researchers on the University of Wisconsin-Madison campus.

== Early life ==
Helen Louise Allen was born in 1902 in Ann Arbor, Michigan. She was raised by her parents and maternal grandmother, Helen.

Allen was taught to knit, crochet, and embroider by her grandmother before first grade. In second grade, Allen's aptitude for design work was recognized by a teacher who called home to compliment Allen’s unique choice of color for a weaving project.

Allen was first introduced to textiles as cultural artifacts through her grandfather’s collection of Chinese fabrics acquired during a trip to the Great Wall of China. In fourth grade, Allen moved with her family to Turkey, where she lived for several years. Here her family acquired fabrics from the area and Allen frequented a local silk weaving shop. Allen was further exposed to textile arts by an uncle who sent Chinese embroideries home while living in China.

Allen earned a bachelor's degree in Applied Art from the Carnegie Institute of Technology in 1923. She later obtained additional degrees from the University of Michigan and the University of Chicago.

== Career ==
In 1927, Allen joined the University of Wisconsin-Madison faculty as a professor in the Related Art Department of the School of Home Economics. Over the next 41 years, she taught weaving, embroidery, and the history of textiles and interior design to hundreds of weaving and design students on the UW-Madison campus. She was considered an expert on weaving techniques and, in addition to her work at the university, gave many lectures at other educational institutions and craft associations. Allen was known for her personal investment in her students’ success.

Allen was among the first in her field to approach textile objects as cultural records through which human nature and history could be better understood. She viewed textiles as keys to understanding people. Today, she is considered a pioneer in the field of material culture.

Over the course of her career, Allen amassed an impressive collection of approximately 4,000 textile objects for use as teaching tools in her lectures and workshops. Allen collected extensively both at home in Madison, Wisconsin and around the world. She planned trips abroad not for leisure, but as a means of supporting her current teaching and research. Her travels, organized during breaks in her teaching schedule, included visits to such countries as Poland, India, Guatemala, and Nigeria. In 1951, she travelled again to Turkey, where she had spent several years in her youth, and added new historic and contemporary textiles from the area to her collection.

Allen collected in order to share what she found with students and fellow researchers. When buying for the collection, Allen sought out pieces that were representative of a particular culture, time period, or technique. Most of what she bought was purchased with her own money. Allen also accepted donations into the collection. She never refused donated pieces, viewing every textile object as a potential teaching tool.

In addition to her teaching and global research, Allen was also an innovative weaver who believed in drawing on traditional methods to express present day designs. As a practicing artist, her work was widely exhibited.

Allen was also an active member of several craft and weaving organizations, including the Madison Weavers' Guild, Wisconsin Designer-Craftsmen, and the American Craftsmen’s Council.

== Publications ==
Allen published American and European Handweaving, a technical and educational resource for weavers, in 1935. A revised edition was published in 1939.

Allen also wrote for several craft magazines and periodicals. She was a frequent contributor to The Weaver, for which she wrote such articles as "Mexican Lace Weaving" and "A Weaver Traveling in Chile".

== Death ==
Helen Louise Allen died unexpectedly in Mineral Point, Wisconsin, on August 14, 1968. She was 66 years old. Funeral services were held in Ann Arbor, Michigan.

Allen’s death was acknowledged in regional news coverage and several nationally circulating periodicals, including the American Craft Council’s Craft Horizons. James W. Cleary, Vice Chancellor for Academic Affairs at the University of Wisconsin-Madison, issued a statement on August 16, 1968 praising Allen’s unique contributions to the university community and describing her loss as having left an “unfillable gap” on campus.

== Legacy ==
Helen Louise Allen is honored on the 100 Women Wall of Honor, a permanent art installation on the University of Wisconsin-Madison campus honoring women’s contributions to family, community, and society.

=== Helen Louise Allen Textile Collection ===
Allen bequeathed the bulk of her estate to the University of Wisconsin-Madison in her will. Her bequest included her collection of approximately 4,000 textile objects and her personal library of books on textiles and weaving. In accordance with her final wishes, these resources officially formed the foundation of what became the Helen Louise Allen Textile Collection.

The Helen Louise Allen Textile Collection has grown substantially since its establishment in 1969 and is stored today in state of the art facilities in the Center for Design and Material Culture of the School of Human Ecology on the University of Wisconsin-Madison campus. Objects in the collection continue to be available as tools for research and instruction and as sources of inspiration to students, researchers, historians, and designers. Allen’s desire to advance understanding of cultures and their history through textiles remains central to the collection’s mission.

In 2019, the university celebrated the golden anniversary of the Helen Louise Allen Textile Collection with two exhibits dedicated to the life and legacy of Helen Louise Allen.
