= Southwestern Range and Sheep Breeding Laboratory Historic District =

Historic district in New Mexico, United States

- U.S. National Register of Historic Places
- Location within New Mexico
- Location: Fort Wingate Work Center, Cibola National Forest, near Fort Wingate, New Mexico
- Coordinates: 35°27′17″N 108°34′08″W
- Area: 81.8 acres (33.1 ha)
- Architect: Mayers, Murray and Phillip
- Architectural style: Pueblo
- NRHP reference No.: 03000488
- Added to NRHP: May 30, 2003

The Southwestern Range and Sheep Breeding Laboratory Historic District is a historic district in Cibola National Forest near Fort Wingate, New Mexico which was listed on the National Register of Historic Places in 2003.

It includes Pueblo Revival architecture. The district is 81.8 acres (33.1 ha) in size and includes 14 contributing buildings, 20 contributing structures, and five contributing sites. It is about 10 miles (16 km) east of Gallup, New Mexico, and 2.2 miles (3.5 km) southwest of Fort Wingate on Forest Road 546.

The focus of the district is a building complex that makes up the Cibola National Forest's Fort Wingate Work Center, which originally was established as the Southwestern Range and Sheep Breeding Laboratory in 1935 by the Bureau of Indian Affairs and the U.S. Department of Agriculture.

It includes buildings designed by the architectural firm of Mayers, Murray, and Phillip.
