= Toronto Choral Society =

The Toronto Choral Society was founded in 1845. Music was a popular form of entertainment for a rapidly growing and prosperous population, so a group of citizens formed a choral society in order to give concerts and foster the development of the local musical community. F.W. Barron, the headmaster of Upper Canada College, became the choir's first president, and James P. Clarke, organist at St. James Cathedral, was its first conductor.

== 1845 to 1900 ==
The Choral Society's debut concert took place at the opening of St. George the Martyr Church on June 25, 1845, with a diverse program including selections from Beethoven, Handel, Mozart and Rossini. That October, the choir's second concert helped commemorate the King's College Triennial, and the choir established the tradition of performing two concerts a year.

When Toronto's first streetcar line opened in 1861, the TCS was there to celebrate the occasion. In 1863, the choir performed at the opening of one of Toronto's most beloved concert venues – Massey Hall. In 1872, the Toronto Choral Society presented the city's very first performance of Handel's Messiah – more than a century after the work was written. In 1860, TCS became a non-auditioned ensemble and that tradition also continues to this day.

On his retirement in 1872, conductor James P. Clarke was succeeded by an equally distinguished musician, Dr. Edward Fisher, founder of the Toronto Conservatory of Music. He presented Mendelssohn’s Athalie in the Horticultural Gardens Pavilion, in what is now Allan Gardens. That venue continued to be used for special occasions such as the first concert of the season.

In its early years, TCS actually commissioned and performed new compositions. Francesco D’Auria, who assumed the conductor's post in 1892, directed the choir that year in the premiere of his own work Gulnare, with words by Mrs. Edgar Jarvis.

== 1900 to present ==
The records are incomplete for the first half of the 20th century; it is known that the tenor and bass sections were depleted during the Second World War. Public performances were suspended, and, for a time, so was the Toronto Choral Society.

In 1986, the Toronto Choral Society resumed operations under the direction of Eric Hanbury, organist and choirmaster at St. Peter's Anglican Church. The choir resumed the tradition of two major performances a year, occasionally interspersed with smaller community concerts. Mr. Hanbury led the choir in works by Mendelssohn, Bach, Wesley, Bruckner, Pinkham, and Rutter, as well as compositions by Canadian composers such as George Fox and Healey Willan.

In 1990, Maura McGroarty, a classically trained singer and choral specialist, became the Toronto Choral Society's director. Her vocal expertise helped the choir's singers, most of whom have little formal musical training, to learn important technical elements of choral singing. Under Ms. McGroarty, the choir performed works by Handel, Bach, Rutter, and Healey Willan, and explored Canadian and American folk songs as well as other light, popular works.

In 1994, leadership of the Toronto Choral Society was assumed by Geoffrey Butler. Under his guidance, TCS has expanded in new directions, performing a variety of sacred, secular, and popular vocal compositions from around the world.

In 1996, TCS celebrated its sesquicentennial with a concert that returned the choir to its roots. The program revisited 1845 and two important social movements of the time: Irish immigration to the New World, and the escape of American slaves to Canada via the Underground Railroad. Combining traditional Irish music and African American spirituals with historical readings, this was one of the most popular in the choir's history and was repeated, by popular demand, in 2001.

Other notable performances have included Ramirez's Navidad Nuestra, Vivaldi's Gloria, Britten's Ceremony of Carols (with harp and children's chorus), Mozart's Requiem, Beethoven's Choral Fantasy in C Minor, performed with the Oakville Symphony Orchestra at Oakville's annual Waterfront Festival, and Carl Orff’s Carmina Burana. In 2004, the choir reprised Handel's Messiah.
