= Nathan Franko's Orchestra =

- Origin: New York/New Jersey
- Years active: Early 1900s
- Past members: Nathan Franko

The Nathan Franko Orchestra played extensively in New York and New Jersey in the early 1900s, they were led by Nathan Franko. The Nathan Franko sounds were indicative of a new era in America and its enjoyment of music.
