= Fragilité (ballet) =

Fragilité was a modern dance solo choreographed by Martha Graham to music by Alexander Scriabin. The piece was originally part of Five Poems, a ballet divided into five solo sections: Fragilité, Lugubre, Poeme ailé, Danse Languide and Désir (first performed in 1926). Each of the sections appears in various programs as individual solos. Five Poems premiered on October 16, 1927, at the Little Theatre in New York City.

Other works on the program were Choral; Adagio (from second Suite); Scherzo, Op. 16 No.2; Tanzstück; Deux Valses; Danse; Tanagra; Esquisse Antique; Lucrezia; Alt-Wein; La Cancion; Ronde; Two Poems of the East and Baal Shem. Graham performed with her small company of dancers: Evelyn Sabin, Betty MacDonald and Rosina Savelli.

According to Dance Magazine's critic, "Fragilité was done in a stylized transparent evening dress made of organdy, exposing enough of the body to see its outline clearly, doing justice to the title." In the biography Martha, Graham's longtime friend Agnes De Mille described the solo as "an exquisite mood picture" done "in half-light, with Martha standing on an elevation of two shallow, round steps dressed in blue gauze of a moonlit translucency..." "It was a dance of such enticement, allure, promise, and evanescence as to tease and excite with the power of dreams."

In a later Dance Magazine article, the piece and Graham's oeuvre were favorably reviewed. "Martha Graham is one of the pioneers of the new era, who, many of us hope will, will stay with us. I certainly hope that she keeps up her inspiring work, developing with such rapid strides as she has in the past two years. It is probably not the easiest thing on earth to create gems that remain with us and frame them for good in our memories. Among them this season were Tanagra, Fragilité, Revolt and Strike."
