= Resurrection (ballet) =

Ballet by Martha Graham

Resurrection is a modern dance solo created by Martha Graham to music by Tibor Harsányi. The piece premiered on March 3, 1929, at the Booth Theatre in New York City. On June 2, 1930, Graham performed another work, Unbalanced, that also used Harsányi's music. Unbalanced does not appear in most Graham chronologies, so it is speculated the two pieces were the same. To confuse things further, a dance critic of the time wrote that Resurrection had previously been titled The Avenger.

Two other new works appeared on the afternoon's program, Adolescence with music by Paul Hindemith, and Danza with a score by Darius Milhaud.

The New York Times' dance critic wrote the work was "composed with complete originality and in faultless form. It builds relentlessly on a striking movement theme to an inevitably foreshadowed climax." The dance's connection to the title was, however, unclear to the reviewer, "it is not spelled out in letters that those who run may read."

The critic for The New York Herald Tribune was even more mystified, "Of the three new numbers offered, Resurrection to music by Harsanvi (sic) was the least definite and effective, a bizarre interpretation in expressionistic vein."
