= Lillian Shapero =

American dancer and choreographer (1908–1988)

Lillian Shapero Rauch (January 17, 1908 – April 19, 1988, born and died in New York City) was an American dancer and choreographer, and a member of the first Martha Graham Dance Company, where she was a performer, assistant choreographer and dancer. She was a choreographer for the musical Oy Is Dus a Leben! She was born on January 17, 1908, and died on April 19, 1988, and her husband was Maurice Rauch.
