= Louis Horst =

American choreographer, composer and pianist (1884–1964)

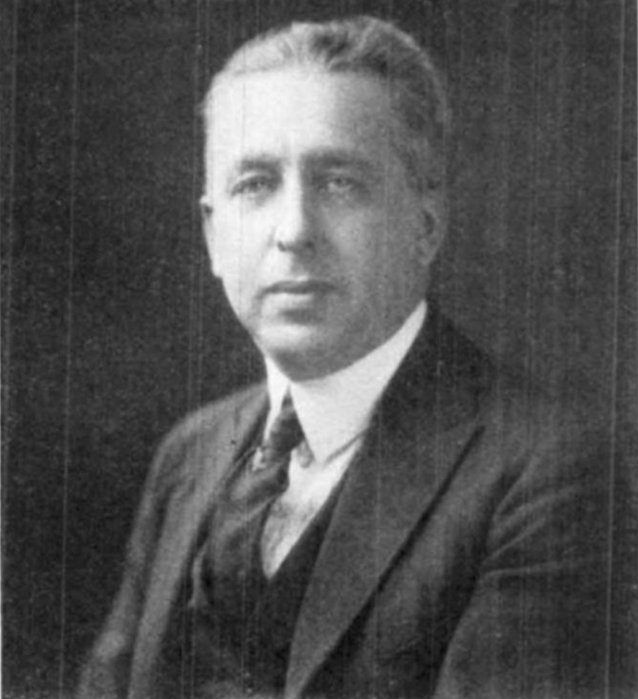
- Portrait of Horst from The Denishawn Magazine, 1925
- Born: January 12, 1884; Kansas City, Missouri
- Died: January 23, 1964 (aged 80); New York City
- Occupations: Composer; Choreographer; Pianist

Louis Horst (born January 12, 1884, Kansas City, Missouri – died January 23, 1964, New York City) was a composer, and pianist. He helped to define the principles of modern dance choreographic technique, most notably the matching of choreography to pre-existing musical structure and the use of contemporary music for dance scores.

== Biography and work ==
Horst studied the violin with John Marquardt. He was the musical director for the Denishawn company (1916-25) before working as musical director and dance composition teacher for Martha Graham's school and dance company (1926-48).

One memorable piece of advice that Horst gave dancers in his lessons in the 1930s, at times delivered in a sarcastic tone: "when in doubt, turn." This is a variant of Ted Shawn's famous line "When in doubt, twirl." The Grateful Dead Almanac adopted it as their motto.

Apart from being a personal friend and mentor to Graham, Horst worked and wrote scores for many other choreographers, including:

- Ruth St. Denis
- Ted Shawn
- Helen Tamiris
- Martha Hill
- Doris Humphrey and Charles Weidman
- Agnes de Mille
- Ruth Page
- Michio Ito
- Adolph Bolm
- Harald Kreutzberg
- Pearl Lang
- Jean Erdman
- Anna Sokolow, Horst's assistant and demonstrator

== Career ==
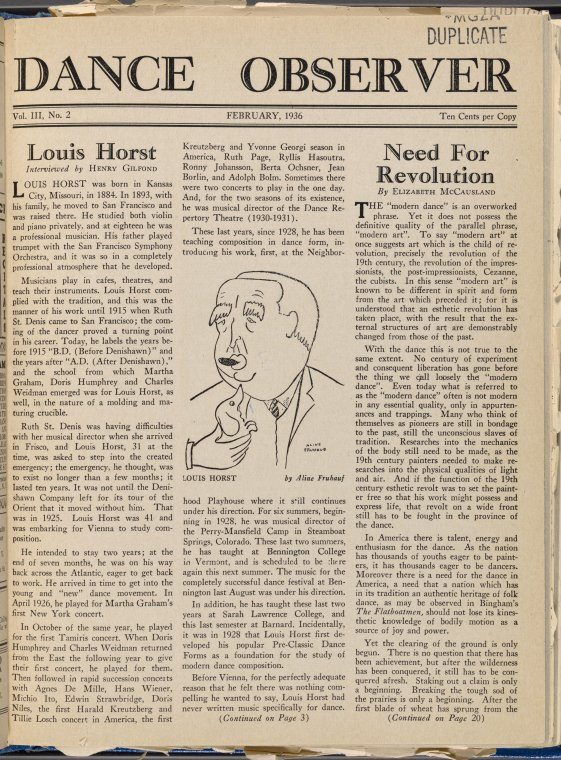
Front cover of the February 1936 article of Dance Observer featuring a caricature of Horst, its editor

Horst composed scores for the Denishawn company, including Japanese Spear Dance (1919). He composed several of Graham's early group works: Primitive Mysteries (1931), Celebration (1934), Frontier (1935), and El Penitente (1940). For Anna Sokolow, Horst composed Noah (1935). He also composed several movie scores.

Horst taught art of choreography at Neighborhood Playhouse School of the Theater (1928-1964), Bennington College (1934-45), Mills College, Connecticut College (1948–63), Barnard College, Sarah Lawrence College, Columbia University, and The Juilliard School (1951-64).

Horst lectured often on "Dance Composition", "Music Composition for Dance", and "Modern Dance and Its Relation to the Other Modern Arts". He wrote and published two books: Pre-classic Dance Forms (1937) and Modern Dance Forms (1960). He founded and edited Dance Observer Journal (1933-64).

In 1964 he became the second recipient of the Heritage Award of the National Dance Association.
