= Insincerities (ballet) =

Insincerities, also known as Four Insincerities, is a solo modern dance work created by Martha Graham. The piece consists of four sections: Petulance, Remorse, Politeness and Vivacity performed to music by Serge Prokofiev. It premiered on January 20, 1929, at the Booth Theatre in New York City. Louis Horst accompanied Graham on piano.

== Background notes ==
Almost all of Graham's early works, including Insincerities, are lost. It is known the solo drew on the idea of Delsartean tableaus, objective representations of mood and emotion. As she constructed her own movement vocabulary, Graham rejected the concepts of her teachers Ruth St. Denis and Ted Shawn by initially referencing previous dance forms.

Insincerities is also known to be one of Graham's first efforts at incorporating humor into her dances, and revealed her talent for parody and comedy.

== Critical reception ==
New York Times dance critic John Martin remarked that Insincerities was "outstanding...impudent and malignant in its comment on the four commonplace human qualities..."

Of a later performance, The New York Herald Tribune's reviewer wrote that many of Graham's "familiar numbers…have lost nothing of their interest and pertinence," adding that Insincerities had "grown wittier with repetition."

A critic less enthralled with Graham described the piece in The Brooklyn Daily Eagle as "very thin, expressing nothing at all with the studious affectation of profundity." In the same article, the writer said Graham was becoming "an uninteresting artist" as her compositions grew "more modern and cerebral."
