= Lynn Garafola =

American linguist

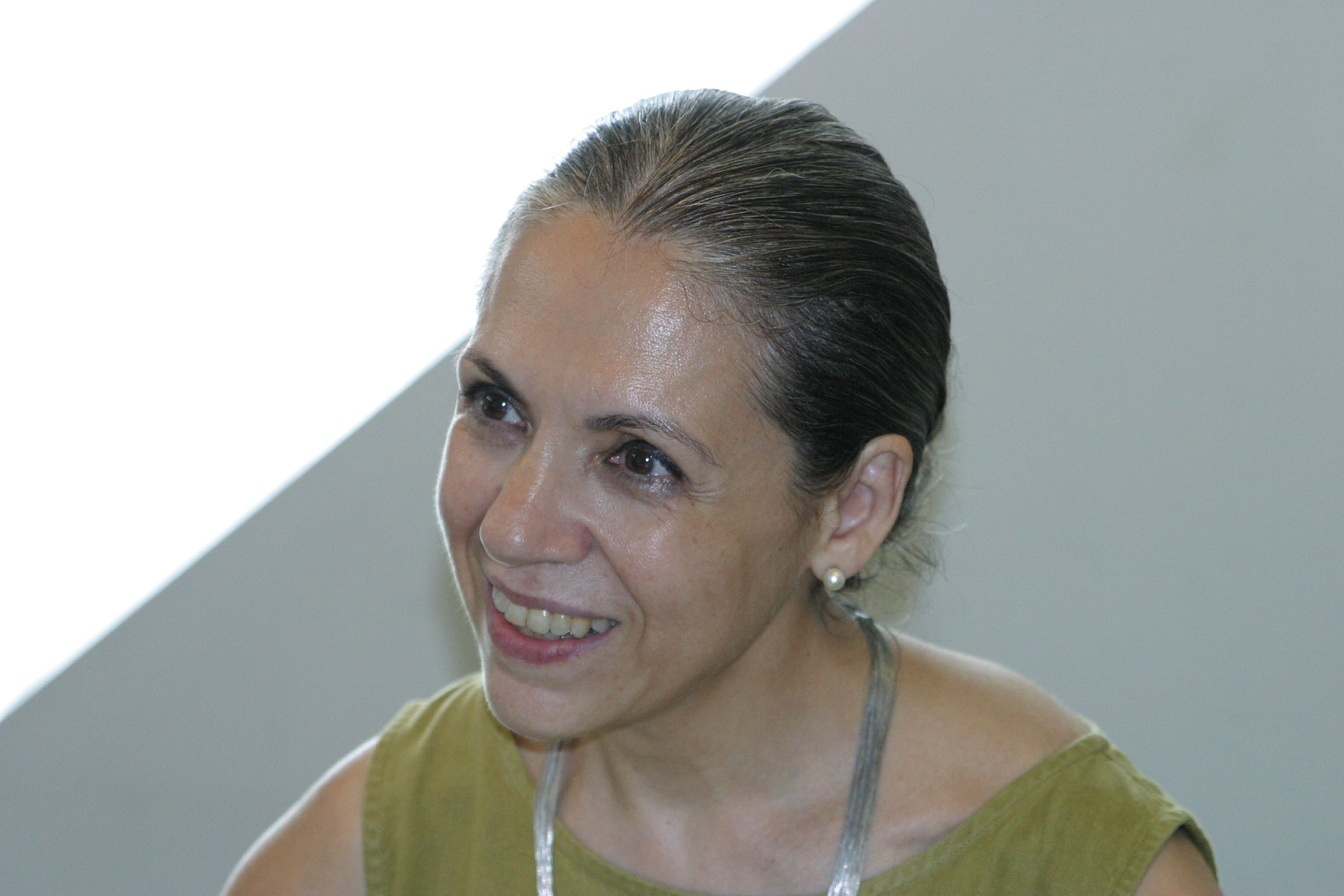
- Lynn Garafola
- Born: Lynn Theresa Garafola; December 12, 1946 (age 79); New York City, New York, U.S.
- Education: Barnard College
- Occupation: Linguist
- Spouse: Eric Foner (m. 1980)
- Awards: Fulbright Fellowship

Lynn Theresa Garafola (born December 12, 1946) is an American dance historian, critic, curator, and educator, based in New York City. Her research and writing focus on twentieth-century dance history in Europe and the United States, with an emphasis on Serge Diaghilev's Ballets Russes, its contemporaries and descendants, and dance in New York City.

She is a professor emeritus of dance at Barnard College, Columbia University.

She is an elected member of the American Academy of Arts and Sciences, and has received fellowships from the Social Science Research Council, National Endowment for the Humanities, Getty Research Institute, John Simon Guggenheim Memorial Foundation, and the Dorothy and Lewis B. Cullman Center for Scholars and Writers. She is also the recipient of a 2016 Dance Magazine Award in addition to prizes for several of her publications.

== Early life and education ==
Born in New York City, Garafola grew up in the Upper Manhattan neighborhood of Washington Heights. Her parents were Louis Salvatore Garafola, a printer and public school teacher, and Rose Joan Marchione; both were children of immigrants from Southern Italy. As a child she attended P.S. 189 and studied ballet under Seda Suny, a teacher from the Russian-Armenian diaspora, who taught and lived in the neighborhood.

In 1958, she entered seventh grade at Hunter College High School, then an all-girls school noted for a strong arts program. At Hunter, she studied modern dance with Alice Halpern and, in her senior year, took outside classes with Alvin Ailey.

Upon graduating from high school in 1964, Garafola entered the freshman class of Barnard College. Throughout her college years, she continued to study dance and to take part in theatrical productions, including some in Spanish. Following two summers of intensive language study abroad, she graduated from Barnard with an A.B. with departmental honors in Spanish in 1968.

She spent the following year in Quito, Ecuador, on a Fulbright Fellowship, studying Latin American literature, teaching English, and traveling extensively. She returned to New York in 1970, working as a translator and beginning work on a Ph.D. at the City University of New York Graduate Center initially in Spanish and subsequently in comparative literature.

== Scholarly works ==
=== Early works ===
In the 1980s and 1990s, Garafola did freelance writing and editing for a number of publications. She contributed reviews, features, and news items to Dance Magazine and wrote on historical and other subjects for Ballet Review, The Nation, The Times Literary Supplement, and The Dancing Times.

She gathered material for a book on Rubinstein that was never published (although it led to talks, articles, and a chapter in her biography of Bronislava Nijinska); and for another on Hubert Stowitts, an American who danced with the company of ballerina Anna Pavlova, became a painter, and disappeared.

She published Diaghilev's Ballets Russes in 1989. What began as a narrow topic – the influence of Diaghilev's Ballets Russes on writers and intellectuals – gradually broadened to include contemporaneous companies such as the Ballets suédois and figures such as Ida Rubinstein. It received the De la Torre Bueno Prize for outstanding book in dance history in 1990.

Serge Diaghilev has never loomed larger than at present, despite the intangibility of his legacy. In Lynn Garafola's artistic, social and economic history of the Ballets Russes (1909-1929), a full-length portrait of the great impresario emerges for the first time. Her skillfully written, critically perceptive and compendious book is indispensable to anyone interested in what from our distance is clearly seen as this century's most fascinating movement in the arts.

— Robert Craft, The Washington Post

Diaghilev's Ballets Russes was followed by a series of edited works and articles in scholarly journals, anthologies, encyclopedias, and popular magazines. With Joan Acocella she edited Andre Levinson on Dance: Writings from Paris in the Twenties, which introduced André Levinson to wider readership after years of relative obscurity. The Diaries of Marius Petipa, which she translated from the original French and published for the first time in their entirety, reflected her growing interest in Russian ballet of the late nineteenth century. Jose Limon: An Unfinished Memoir reflected both her interest in New York-centered modern dance. In 1999 an award from the Congress of Research in Dance recognized the book as the year's outstanding scholarly dance publication. Many of the essays she published in this period were collected in her second book, Legacies of Twentieth-Century Dance (2005).

Beginning in 1986, when she served as historical consultant for Nancy Van Norman Baer's exhibition Bronislava Nijinska: A Dancer's Legacy at the Fine Arts Museums of San Francisco, Garafola has worked on a number of exhibitions. Among these was the 1999 exhibition Dance for a City: Fifty Years of the New York City Ballet at the New-York Historical Society, which she curated and for which she edited the accompanying volume with her husband, historian Eric Foner. With Norton Owen, the Director of Preservation at Jacob's Pillow, she curated America's Irreplaceable Dance Treasures: The First 100, a traveling exhibition sponsored by the Dance Heritage Coalition.

=== Later works ===
She also did several exhibitions at the New York Public Library for the Performing Arts – 500 Years of Italian Dance: Treasures from the New York Public Library's Cia Fornaroli Collection (with Patrizia Veroli) (2006-7); New York Story: Jerome Robbins and His World (2008); and Diaghilev's Theater of Marvels: The Ballets Russes and Its Aftermath (2009). She curated another New York City-centered exhibition in 2018 at Columbia University's Wallach Art Gallery, called Arthur Mitchell: Harlem's Ballet Trailblazer. It was the first major exhibition focused on Arthur Mitchell, the founder of the Dance Theatre of Harlem.

Garafola served as a content consultant for two later exhibitions on the Ballets Russes: Hymn to Apollo: The Ancient World and the Ballets Russes (2019) at New York University's Institute for the Study of the Ancient World, and Crafting the Ballets Russes: Music, Dance, Design: The Robert Owen Lehman Collection (2024), at the Morgan Library & Museum. For the latter, she wrote an essay titled "Diaghilev Man of Music."

Since 1981, when she reviewed Bronislava Nijinska's Early Memoirs, Garafola had wanted to write a book about Vaslav Nijinsky's underrecognized sister. La Nijinska: Choreographer of the Modern was published in 2022. Tracing Nijinska's career across continents was made possible by the digitization of many materials Garafola used, to assess of the impact of her choreography and examine the role that sexism played in her life and work.

After the publication of her biography of Bronislava Nijinska, Garafola turned her attention to the life and legacy of dancer and choreographer Arthur Mitchell. Drawing on the Arthur Mitchell Collection at Columbia University and interviews with more than one hundred individuals, she authored Arthur Mitchell: The Extraordinary Life of Harlem's Ballet Visionary (2026). The biography examines Mitchell's career as the first Black principal dancer of the New York City Ballet and as the founder of the Dance Theatre of Harlem in 1969. Set against the backdrop of the civil rights and Black Arts movements, the book explores Mitchell's efforts to expand opportunities for Black dancers and his role in linking ballet with broader questions of racial equality and cultural representation.

== Academic career ==
In 2000, Garafola began teaching dance history and research courses in Barnard College's Dance Department. Her courses ranged across centuries of U.S. and European dance history, with a focus on ballet and concert dance.

She also developed a course on African-American dance, integrating vernacular styles of performance with concert and jazz traditions. In all her courses she included research components, aiming to introduce students to dance literature and to the sources used in writing dance history. She also taught the Senior Seminar in Dance, directing original research projects by senior dance majors.

In addition to her work as a teacher, Garafola organized public programs at Barnard and in collaboration with Columbia University's Harriman Institute. These ranged from lectures and conversations to full-scale conferences, such as Russian Movement Culture of the 1920s and 1930s (2015) and Dancing the Cold War (2017). In 2011, she founded and continues to direct the Columbia University Seminar "Studies in Dance", the first such seminar to focus on dance. Open to members of the university and the broader metropolitan community, the seminar hosts 7-8 speakers each year presenting on a range of topics.

Her other projects include an edited volume based on the Russian Movement Culture of the 1920s and 1930s symposium organized with Catharine Theimer Nepomnyashchy at the Harriman Institute in February 2015, published by the Harriman Institute in fall 2015; and Dancing the Cold War, an edited volume based on a symposium sponsored by the Harriman Institute in February 2017, published by the Harriman Institute in winter 2018.

In addition to her teaching in the Dance Department, Garafola also directed thesis projects in American studies and Slavic studies and theses combining dance with American studies, Africana Studies, and European studies.

=== Other works ===
Garafola served as editor of the Society of Dance History Scholars' publication Studies in Dance History from 1991–98, returning in 2002 for a two-year term as chair of the society's editorial board.

Over the years she has served as a manuscript reader for several academic presses; sat on the jury for the Dance Magazine Awards and the De la Torre Bueno Prize,; reviewed proposals for the American Council of Learned Societies fellowship program, the Getty Center for the History of Art and Humanities, and the National Endowment for the Humanities; and served as an external examiner for various college programs and departments.

== Personal life ==
Garafola married historian Eric Foner in 1980 and is the mother of art historian Daria Foner. She lives in New York City.

== Publications ==
=== Books ===
- 1989. Diaghilev's Ballets Russes. New York: Oxford University Press.
- 1991. André Levinson on Dance: Writings from Paris in the Twenties. Editor with Joan Acocella. Wesleyan University Press.
- 1991. The Diaries of Marius Petipa. Translator and editor. Society of Dance History Scholars.
- 1993. The Origins of the Bolero School (eds. Javier Suárez-Parajes and Xoán M. Carreira). Translator with Elizabeth Coonrod Martinez and Aurelia de la Vega. Editor. Society of Dance History Scholars.
- 1994. Of, By, and For the People: Dancing on the Left in the 1930s. Editor. Society of Dance History Scholars.
- 1997. Rethinking the Sylph: New Perspectives on the Romantic Ballet. Editor. Wesleyan University Press.
- 1998. José Limon: An Unfinished Memoir. Editor. Wesleyan University Press.
- 1999. Dance for a City: Fifty Years of the New York City Ballet. Editor with Eric Foner. New York: Columbia University Press.
- 1999. The Ballets Russes and Its World. Editor with Nancy Van Norman Baer. Yale University Press.
- 2005. Legacies of Twentieth-Century Dance. Wesleyan University Press.
- 2011. Sergei Diaghilev and the Ballets Russes: A Tribute to the First Hundred Years. Experiment: Journal of Russian Culture, vol. 17. Editor with John Ellis Bowlt. Los Angeles Institute of Modern Russian Culture, University of Southern California.
- 2015. Russian Movement Culture of the 1920s and 1930s: A Symposium Organized by Lynn Garafola and Catharine Theimer Nepomnyashchy. Editor. Harriman Institute.
- 2018. Dancing the Cold War: An International Symposium. Editor. Harriman Institute.
- 2022. La Nijinska: Choreographer of the Modern. New York: Oxford University Press.
- 2026. Arthur Mitchell: The Extraordinary Life of Harlem’s Ballet Visionary. New Haven: Yale University Press, 2026.

=== Selected book chapters ===
- 1983. "Les Soirées de Paris." In Lydia Lopokova, edited by Milo Keynes. London: Weidenfeld & Nicolson.
- 1988. "Toward an American Dance: Dance in the City, 1940–1965." In New York: Culture Capital of the World, 1940–1965, edited by Leonard Wallock. New York: Rizzoli.
- 1988. "The Ballets Russes in America." In The Art of Enchantment: Diaghilev's Ballets Russes, 1909–1929, edited by Nancy Van Norman Baer. New York: Universe Books.
- 1995. "The Ballets Suédois and the Ballets Russes." In Paris Modern: The Swedish Ballet, 1920–1925, edited by Nancy Van Norman Baer. Fine Arts Museums of San Francisco.
- 2001. "The Choreography of Le Tricorne." In Los Ballets Russes de Diaghilev y España (The Ballets Russes of Diaghilev and Spain), edited by Yvan Nommick and Antonio Alvarez Cañibano. Madrid: Centro de Documentación de Música y Danza.
- 2003. "Ballet: Reinvention and Continuity over Five Centuries." In The Living Dance: An Anthology of Essays on Movement and Culture, edited by Judith Chazin-Bennahum. Dubuque, Iowa: Kendall Hunt Publishing Company.
- 2005. "Agrippina Vaganova and Her Times." In Vaganova: A Dance Journey from Petersburg to Leningrad, by Vera Krasovskaya, translated from the Russian by Vera M. Siegel. Gainesville: University Press of Florida.
- 2007. "Voice of the Zeitgeist: Sally Banes and Her Times." In Before, Between, After: Three Decades of Dance Writing, by Sally Banes. Madison: University of Wisconsin Press.
- 2009. "Workshop of the Muses: Diaghilev and Monte Carlo." In A Feast of Wonders: Sergei Diaghilev and the Ballets Russes, edited by John Ellis Bowlt. Milan: Skira Rizzoli.
- 2011. "Astonish Me!: Diaghilev, Massine, and the Experimentalist Tradition." In Ballets Russes in Australia and Beyond, edited by Mark Carroll. Adelaide: Wakefield Press.
- 2011. "Abstraction and the Dance: Bronislava Nijinska's Les Noces." In Arturo Herrera: Les Noces (The Wedding), edited by Gabriela Rangel. New York: Americas Society.
- 2013. "Diaghilev’s Ballets Russes: A New Kind of Company." In Avatar of Modernity: The Rite of Spring Reconsidered, edited by Hermann Danuser and Heidy Zimmermann. London: Paul Sacher Foundation/Boosey & Hawkes, 2013.
- 2014. "Chernota delaet roscherk v dyshe moei" (Blackness makes a stroke on my soul). In Mnemozina: dokumenty I facty iz istorii otechestvennogo teatra XX veka, edited by V.V. Ivanov. Moscow: Indrik.
- 2014. “Foreword." In Like a Bomb Going Off: Leonid Yakobson and Ballet as Resistance in Soviet Russia, by Janice Ross. New Haven: Yale University Press, 2014.
- 2014. "In Search of Eden: Bronislava Nijinska in California." In Kinetic Los Angeles: Russian Emigrés in the City of Self-Transformation, edited by Lorin Johnson. Leiden: Brill Publishers. Special issue of Experiment: Journal of Russian Culture (20).
- 2016. “H.P.: A Lost Dance of the Americas.” In Dance: American Art 1830–1960, edited by Jane Dini. Detroit Institute of Arts/Yale University Press.
- 2017. “A Century of 'Rites': The Making of an Avant-Garde Tradition.” In The Rite of Spring at 100, edited by Severine Neff, Maureen Carr, and Gretchen Horlacher, with John Reef. Bloomington: Indiana University Press.
- 2019. “Lincoln Kirstein, Man of the People.” In Lincoln Kirstein's Modern, edited by Samantha Friedman and Jodi Hauptman. New York: Museum of Modern Art.
- 2023. “The Traumatic Birth of Le Train Bleu.” In Picasso/Chanel, edited by Ana Cela, Catali Garrigues, Ángela Villaverde. Madrid: Museo Nacioinal Thyssen-Bornemisza.
- 2024. “Diaghilev: Man of Music." In Crafting the Ballets Russes: Music, Dance, Design: The Robert Owen Lehman Collection, by Robinson McClellan. New York: Morgan Library & Museum.

=== Selected journal articles ===
- 1982. "Hollywood and the Myth of the Working Class." Radical America (January–February 1980).
- 1985–1986. "The Travesty Dancer in Nineteenth-Century Ballet." Dance Research Journal 17.2 (Fall 1985) and 18.1 (Spring 1986). Reprinted in Crossing the Stage: Controversies on Cross-Dressing, edited by Lesley Ferris (London: Routledge, 1993).
- 1988. "Mark Morris and the Feminine Mystique." Ballet Review 16.3 (December 1988).
- 1995. "Forgotten Interlude: Eurhythmic Dancers at the Paris Opera." Dance Research 13.1 (Summer 1995).
- 1995. "A las Márganes del Occidente: El Destino Transpirenaico de la Danza Española desde la Época del Romanticismo" ("On the Margins of the West: The Destiny of Spanish Dance beyond the Pyrenees since the Era of Romanticism"). Cairón: Revista del Estudios de Danza (1995).
- 2001. “George Antheil and the Dance.” Ballet Review 29.3 (Fall 2001). doi:10.7916/D8TX3DG5
- 2002. "Dollars for Dance: Lincoln Kirstein, City Center, and the Rockefeller Foundation." Dance Chronicle 25.1 (Spring 2002).
- 2002. “Writing on the Left: The Remarkable Career of Edna Ocko.” Dance Research Journal 34.1 (Summer 2002).
- 2006. "Making Dances: Process and Practice in Diaghilev's Ballets Russes." Culture Teatrali: Studi, Interventi e Scrittore sullo Spettacolo 14 (Spring 2006), special issue edited by Rosella Mazzaglia. Reprinted in Denkfiguren: Performatives zwischen Bewegen, Schreiben und Erfinden (Conceptions of Interactions between Movement, Writing, and Creativity), edited by Nicole Haitzinger and Karin Fenbock (Munich: Epodium Verlag, 2010).
- 2006. "Serguéi Diághilev: La Creación del Ballet Moderno" ("Sergei Diaghilev: The Creation of Modern Ballet"). La Tempestad 8.50 (October 2006).
- 2011. “Crafted by Many Hands: Re-Reading Bronislava Nijinska’s Early Memoirs.” Dance Research 29.1 (Summer 2011).
- 2011. “An Amazon of the Avant-Garde: Bronislava Nijinska in Revolutionary Russia.” Dance Research 29.2 (Winter 2011).
- 2015. “Interlude oubliée: la danse rythmique à l’Opéra de Paris.” Translated by Marina Nordera. Recherches en Danse (January 2015).

=== Selected lectures and public readings ===
- 1985. "Remaking Ballet in the Diaghilev Era: The Choreographic Revolution of Fokine, Nijinsky, Massine, and Nijinska." The Houston Seminar, Texas.
- 1991. "Nijinsky and Nijinska." Calouste Gulbenkian Foundation, Lisbon.
- 1993. "Writing the History of Dance." Pembroke College History Society, University of Oxford.
- 1996. "Léonide Massine: Symphonic Choreographer." New York Public Library for the Performing Arts.
- 2000. "George Antheil and the Dance." Cooper Union, New York.
- 2002. "Stravinsky and Ida Rubenstein." University of British Columbia, Vancouver.
- 2003. "On Your Toes, or The Americanization of George Balanchine." Popular Culture Association, New Orleans.
- 2004. "Balanchine and the Many Roots of Abstraction." Hermitage Theatre, Saint Petersburg.
- 2006. "A Model of Female Empowerment: Isadora Duncan and the Early Choreographic Career of Bronislava Nijinska." Harriman Institute, Columbia University, New York.
- 2009. "Crossing Borders, Transcending Boundaries: Diaghilev's Ballets Russes and the Birth of Ballet Modernism." Macalester College, Saint Paul.
- 2011. "The Ballets Russes and Twentieth-Century Dance." Waseda University, Tokyo.
- 2013. "Making Ballet Modern: Modernism and Diaghilev's Ballets Russes." George Washington University Summer in Paris.
- 2013. "A Century of Rites: The Making of an Avant-garde Tradition." Emory University, Atlanta; University of Dayton, Ohio; and Institut fŭr Theaterwissenschaft, Free University of Berlin.
- 2013. "Discourses of Memory: The Marginalization of Bronislava Nijinska." Gender and Creation in the History of the Performing Arts, Paris.
- 2015. "Dancing through Adversity: Bronislava Nijinska's Théâtre de la Danse, 1932–34." Athens, Greece.
- 2017. "Concealments and Revelations of the First Person:Bronislava Nijinska's Diaries." Seminério Internacional de História da Dança, Federal University of Goiás, Brazil.
- 2017. "Amazon of the Avant-Garde on a Global Stage." Dance and the Avant-Garde in Central and Eastern Europe, Adam Mickiewicz Institute, Lublin.
- 2018. "Bronislava Nijinska y el nacionalismo coreográfico de 'Rusia en el extranjero'" (Bronislava Nijinska and the Choreographic Nationalism of "Russia Abroad"). Jornadas de investigación de danza XI, Buenos Aires.
- 2018. "Bronislava Nijinska – from Kyiv to Hollywood." America House, Kyiv.
- 2019. "Pilgrimage to an Imagined West: Antiquity and the Early Ballets Russes." Institute for the Study of the Ancient World, New York.
- 2019. "The African-American Presence in Postwar American Ballet." University of California, Santa Barbara.
- 2019. “The Long History of Bronislava Nijinska’s Bolero.” Repensar El sombrero de tres picos: cien años después, Madrasa of Granada, Granada.
- 2020. "Gendered Selves and the Melancholy of Being: Francis Poulenc and Bronislava Nijinska." Within and Without: ‘Les Six’ at 100, Princeton University.
- 2020. "Anna Pavlova: A Ballerina for All.” Ballerina: Fashion's Modern Muse, Fashion Institute of Technology.
- 2024. "Diaghilev—Man of Music." Crafting the Ballets Russes: The Robert Owen Lehman Collection, Morgan Library & Museum.

== Selected exhibitions ==
- 1986. Historical consultant. Bronislava Nijinska: A Dancer's Legacy. Curated by Nancy Van Norman Baer. Fine Arts Museums of San Francisco.
- 1988. Historical consultant. The Art of Enchantment: Diaghilev's Ballets Russes, 1909–1929. Fine Arts Museums of San Francisco.
- 1999. Guest curator. Dance for a City: Fifty Years of the New York City Ballet. New-York Historical Society.
- 2000. Guest curator. Dance at the White Barn. White Barn Theater Museum, Westport, Connecticut.
- 2004–2005. Guest curator, with Norton Owen. America's Irreplaceable Dance Treasures: The First 100. Traveling exhibition sponsored by the Dance Heritage Coalition, Washington, D.C., and mounted in four venues: San Francisco Performing Arts Library and Museum (Winter 2004); Blake's Barn, Jacob's Pillow Dance Festival, Beckett, Massachusetts (Summer 2004); Music and Dance Library, Ohio State University (Autumn 2004); and New York Public Library for the Performing Arts (Summer 2005).
- 2006–2007. Guest curator, with Patrizia Veroli. 500 Years of Italian Dance: Treasures from the New York Public Library's Cia Fornaroli Collection. New York Public Library for the Performing Arts.
- 2008. Guest curator. New York Story: Jerome Robbins and His World. New York Public Library for the Performing Arts.
- 2009. Guest curator. Diaghilev's Theater of Marvels: The Ballets Russes and Its Aftermath. New York Public Library for the Performing Arts.
- 2018. Guest curator. Arthur Mitchell: Harlem's Ballet Trailblazer. Wallach Art Gallery, Columbia University.

== Awards and fellowships ==
- 1968. Fulbright Fellowship
- 1978. Social Science Research Council fellowship
- 1986. Getty Foundation fellowship
- 1990. De la Torre Bueno Prize for Diaghilev's Ballets Russes
- 1991. Getty Research Institute Scholar-in-Residence
- 1993. National Endowment for the Humanities fellowship
- 1999. Congress on Research in Dance Award for José Limon: An Unfinished Memoir
- 2000. Independent Publisher Book Award for Dance for a City: Fifty Years of the New York City Ballet
- 2005. Kurt Weill Prize from the Kurt Weill Foundation for Music for The Ballets Russes and Its World
- 2008. Emily Gregory Award from the trustees of Barnard College for excellence in teaching
- 2013. New York Public Library for the Performing Arts Dorothy and Lewis B. Cullman Center for Scholars and Writers fellowship
- 2013. Guggenheim Fellowship
