= Sally Banes =

American dance historian (1950–2020)

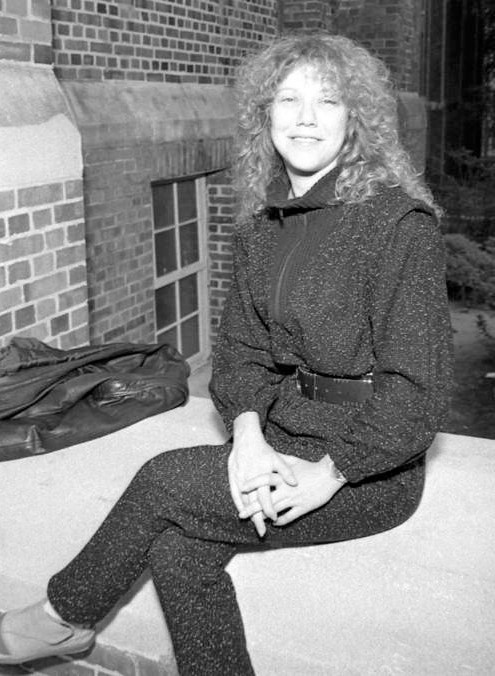
- (1985)
- Born: October 9, 1950; Silver Spring, Maryland
- Died: June 14, 2020 (aged 69); Philadelphia, Pennsylvania
- Occupations: Dance Critic; Dance Historian; Writer
- Spouse: Noël Carroll

Sally Rachel Banes (October 9, 1950 – June 14, 2020) was a notable dance historian, writer, and critic.

== Life, education, and performance career ==
Born and raised in Silver Spring, Maryland, a suburb of Washington, D.C., Banes studied dance, and particularly ballet, throughout her childhood. She attended the University of Chicago and graduated in 1972 with an interdisciplinary degree in criticism, art, and theater. While at college, she worked as a lighting assistant and wardrobe mistress. She also belonged to a group known as The Collective. Joining in 1970, Banes became one of several actors who met several times a week to collaborate on work. These collectively written theater pieces were performed in workshops as well as public performances.

After graduating college, Banes continued to live and work in Chicago. In 1974, she founded the Community Discount Players which was a loosely organized company of actors, dancers, filmmakers, and visual artists. Like The Collective, the Community Discount Players focused on collaboration to produce work and performances. She also founded MoMing, which was a collectively owned theater where actors and dancers could come to teach one another class. It also provided an environment for further collaborative efforts and the performance of these partnerships. This is where she first performed for Kenneth King. She also performed in ‘’Paris/Chacon,’’ a dance-theater collaboration by Meredith Monk and Ping Chong.

In 1976, Banes moved to New York City. She continued exploring the post-modern world and attended workshops with members of Judson Dance. She also performed for Simone Forti, Kenneth King, and Meredith Monk. As she grew older, Banes continued to take dance classes in both Chicago and New York City. She studied ballet with Ed Parish and Peter Saul. She also studied modern with Jim Self, Maggie Kast, and Shirley Mordine as well as taking class at both the Martha Graham and Merce Cunningham studios. At one point she raised $70,000 for an alternative multicultural bicentennial celebration. In 1978 Banes produced a film of Yvonne Rainer's 1966 dance piece "Trio A (The Mind is a Muscle, Part 1)."

While in New York, she continued her education by enrolling in NYU’s Department of Graduate Drama. She earned her PhD with a dissertation on Judson Dance Theater. This dissertation was later published as ‘’Democracy’s Body: Judson Dance Theater, 1962–1964.’’ While doing her doctorate work, she studied under and with some of the biggest names in dance research. Her doctoral advisor was Michael Kirby and she also learned from Deborah Jowitt, John Mueller, Dale Harris, Gretchen Schneider, David Vaughan, and Selma Jeanne Cohen. Some of her classmates were Sally Sommer, Barbara Barker, Brenda Dixon-Gottschild, and Joan Acocella.

== Personal life ==
Banes was married to fellow art and film philosopher Noël Carroll. In May 2002 Banes suffered a massive stroke, from which she never recovered. She remained cognitively and physically severely handicapped until her death of ovarian cancer on June 14, 2020.

== Artistic work ==
Banes' first work, A Day in the Life of the Mind: Part 2, was created in collaboration with dancer Ellen Mazer. It was a day-long performance beginning at the lagoon in Hyde Park and ending at a popular local bar, Jimmy's. The audience followed the performers from the lagoon and down 57th Street while listening to a Charlie Parker record on repeat and having soybeans thrown at them. On the way, the performance traveled through Banes' apartment, conveniently located on 57th Street, where they were greeted by her grandmother. They exited onto her back porch and continued on. When it became dark nightgown-clad dancers appeared in the large lighted windows of the Regenstein Library as the performance continued to its end at Jimmy's. This work was meant to be a celebration of Hyde Park as well as the blurring of lines between everyday life and art.

Banes also collaborated with Ellen Mazer on a series of works about an imaginary 19th century woman named "Sophie," who was "sometimes a ballerina, sometimes a communist." In the piece Sophie Eats Shrimp, Banes and Mazer load cartons on and off a rental truck. In another piece, an old-fashioned washing machine and pieces of broken glass litter the stage. Banes continued to explore "Sophie" upon reaching New York in her piece Sophie Heightens the Contradiction which was performed at P.S. 122 in 1983.

== Writing and research ==
Banes first worked for the Chicago Reader starting in 1973. Initially, she was in charge of theater and restaurant reviews. She also wrote book reviews for the Chicago Tribune. Sweet Home Chicago: The Real City Guide, coauthored by Banes, was her first published book. One day, a colleague approached her with a proposition. This colleague had been commissioned to write a book about modern dance but was claustrophobic and therefore could not sit through shows. Banes took over the project and decided that the best way to learn how to write about dance was to practice. Thus, she convinced her editor at the Chicago Reader to allow her to write dance critiques, and eventually became the Dance Editor. This book eventually became Terpsichore in Sneakers: Post-Modern Dance, published in 1980. She stayed at the Reader until 1976 when she moved to New York City.

Upon reaching New York, she continued working as a dance critic for the Village Voice, the SoHo Weekly News, and Dance Magazine, as well as working as editor for the Dance Research Journal from 1982 to 1988. Since these times, she has authored eight major books about dance, frequently of the post-modern era.

On top of an extensive written portfolio, Banes has taught at various institutions. She was an assistant professor at Florida State University in 1980. From 1981 to 1986, she taught at SUNY Purchase. From 1986 to 1988, she taught at Wesleyan University and from 1988 to 1991 she taught at Cornell University. Finally, starting in 1991, she began teaching at University of Wisconsin – Madison where she was the Marian Hannah Winter Professor of Theater and Dance Studies. She was also the chair of the dance program at UW – Madison from 1992 to 1996.

Banes was a past president and Honorary Fellow of the Society of Dance History Scholars. In 1989 and 1998, she presented at the Society of Dance History Scholars Conference. The first time her lecture was titled, "Merce Cunningham's Story." The second conference she presented "The Last Conversation: Eisenstein's Carmen Ballet".

Terpsichore in Sneakers: Post-modern Dance (1987)

This work is a history and critical study of post-modern dance. It specifically focuses on certain choreographers and their styles, motivations, goals, and works. The choreographers include Simone Forti, Yvonne Rainer, Steve Paxton, Trisha Brown, David Gordon, Deborah Hay, Lucinda Childs, Meredith Monk, Kenneth King, Douglas Dunn, and The Grand Union.

Rainer, Simone Forti, Steve Paxton, and other post-modern choreographers of the sixties were not united in terms of their aesthetic. Rather, they were united by their radical approach to choreography, their urge to reconceive the medium of dance. – Sally Banes, Terpsichore in Sneakers: Post-modern Dance

Democracy's Body: Judson Dance Theater, 1962–1964 (1993)

A history of the revolutionary Judson Dance Theater, whose choreographers and works represented the beginning of the post-modern movement, it not only tells the story of Judson Dance Theater but describes the dances produced by those in the group and the dynamics of the group's working relationships.

The choreographers of the Judson Dance Theater radically questioned dance aesthetics, both in their dances and in their weekly discussions. They rejected the codification of both ballet and modern dance. They questioned the traditional dance concert format and explored the nature of dance performance. They also discovered a cooperative method for producing dance concerts... Attracting a grassroots audience of Greenwich Village artists and intellectuals, the Judson Dance Theater affected the entire community and flourished as a popular center of experimentation. – Sally Banes, Democracy's Body: Judson Dance Theater, 1962–1964

Greenwich Village 1963: Avant-garde Performance and the Effervescent Body (1993)

This book focuses on the year 1963 and the changing face of the art world. It specifically focuses on Greenwich Village and the performing arts.

A distinctively twentieth-century, postwar, postindustrialist American avant-garde art: democratic yet sophisticated, vigorous and physical, playful yet down-to-earth, freely mixing high and low, academic and vernacular traditions, genres and media. There was a feeling – so unlike the early 1990s – that all things were possible... and permitted. – Sally Banes, Greenwich Village 1963: Avant-garde Performance and the Effervescent Body

Writing Dancing in the Age of Postmodernism (1994)

This book is an anthology of published and unpublished essays and talks about dance since the 1970s. Through this collection, as well as the evolution of her own writing and style of analysis, Banes explores the evolution of postmodern dance throughout the 60s, 70s, and 80s.

Perhaps to some readers this collection simply will appear to be a mélange. But I am convinced that it is emblematic of postmodernism, in a number of ways. It is, first of all, concerned with crossovers between 'high' and 'low' dance cultures – the avant-garde, the popular, the commercial, and the vernacular. Moreover, it analyzes relationships between mainstream dance and its counterstreams, which contest, challenge, subvert, and undermine the mainstream traditions. In terms of methodology, my approach is postmodernist in that it has a tendency toward the contextual, historical, and ethnographic. It is also concerned with bringing the margins to the center. – Sally Banes, Writing Dancing in the Age of Postmodernism

Dancing Women: Female Bodies on Stage (1998)

Banes' attempts to retell the familiar dance canonical history from the purely feminist perspective. She covers everything from mid nineteenth century Romantic ballet in France and Denmark to historical modern dance of the 1920s, 1930s, and 1940s in Germany and the United States to contemporary ballet from the 1930s to the 1950s in Europe and the United States.

In each chapter I focus on one or several dances, in order to retell the story of Western theatrical dancing from a woman-centered perspective. I analyze of representations of women are constructed in major works of the theatrical dance canon written by both men and women. Setting the creation of these works in socio-political and cultural context, I show that choreographers have created images of women that are shaped by – and that in part shape – society’s continuing debates about sexuality and female identity. I argue that the dance stage has often reflected and reinforced, but has also formed and in some cases criticized cultural conceptions of corporeality – in particular, conceptions of women’s bodies and identities – and that through dance, men’s attitudes toward women and women’s attitudes about themselves are literally given body on stage. – Sally Banes, Dancing Women: Female Bodies on Stage

Subversive Expectations: Performance Art and Paratheater in New York 1976–1985 (1998)

This book is a collection of Banes’ reviews and articles concerning New York performance art and paratheater from 1976 to 1985. These articles were published chiefly in the Village Voice and the SoHo Weekly News, two alternative publications based in New York City. This time period was the height of the performance art genre, which had surpassed other forms of avant-garde to become “the preeminent form of avant-garde art.” This volume contains 90 articles and reviews including those of Yvonne Rainer, Meredith Monk, The Ringling Brothers, and Whoopi Goldberg.

Unlike mainstream theater productions, which can flourish or die according to critical reaction, performance art – usually operating on a shoestring budget or with funding subsidies – did not depend on a critical mass of spectators for economic well-being. And alternative press critics like me certainly did not wield the make-or-break power of the mainstream press. In any case, most of the performances were one-night stands or short runs and had ended by the time my reviews were published. So I felt a certain freedom in knowing that my role as a critic was not that of a judge, arbiter of taste, or consumer guide. Rather, my role was to join a longer-term conversation about performance art in a public yet immediate way. – Sally Banes, Subversive Expectations: Performance Art and Paratheater in New York 1976–1985

Reinventing Dance in the 1960s: Everything was Possible (2003)

This book is a collection of essays analyzing the revolutionary and experimental art world of the 1960s. It consists of eleven essays, including one by Banes herself and a section of choreographers' statements from the White Oak PASTForward project, organized by Mikhail Baryshnikov. These choreographers include Trisha Brown, Lucinda Childs, Simone Forti, David Gordon, Deborah Hay, Steve Paxton, and Yvonne Rainer.

The 1960s was a decade of ferment in the arts, society, and politics. So many things that had been viewed complacently, in a world that seemed always to be the same as it ever was, were suddenly cast in a new light. And this led to a desire to cast off the old ways, to break all the rules, to find new directions and new freedoms. There were no limits, nothing that could not be tried, from rising up to protest injustices like racism, sexism, and the Vietnam War to ingesting mind-expanding drugs to sexual experimentation. – Sally Banes, Reinventing Dance in the 1960s: Everything was Possible

Before, Between, and Beyond: Three Decades of Dance Writing (2007)

This book is a collection of Banes' reviews history of dancers and choreographers. These reviews feature everything from early Bill T. Jones/Arnie Zane performances, to the beginnings of Pilobolus, to the discovery of breakdancing, to the world's introduction to Elizabeth Streb, as a performer.

Many of the emerging artists Banes reviewed are now luminaries of the historical canon... Like all collections of dance reviews, this one not only provides a valuable register of dances and dancers, it also points out the importance and responsibility of dance criticism as it engages with an art form whose history largely exists in movement, in a culture that privileges what can be written down. – Andrea Harris, Before, Between, and Beyond: Three Decades of Dance Writing

Dance Research Journal (Congress on Research in Dance) 29/1 Spring (1997), 30/1 Spring (1998), 31/1 Spring (1999)

In this specialized academic journal, Banes and Carroll debate Gregory Scott, at the time the Director of Doctoral Studies in Dance Education, NYU, in a series of 3 articles (and in conferences), when a reaction to post-modernism in dance has begun. Scott argues for a traditional view of dance that has been applicable for over 2000 years, stemming from Plato's Laws II (665a), as “ordered body movement”, which Plato says makes choral art when combined with music or song (harmonia) in the theater. Ironically, this conception even allows Rainier's Trio A, which Banes championed, to be dance. Nevertheless, Scott critiques some of the principles of post-modernism as Banes and Carroll define them, setting up a further debate stemming from Carroll and Banes's ″Dance, Imitation and Representation″ (1999; espec. pp. 14–20), that continue most recently until 2019, in Scott's A Primer on Aristotle's DRAMATICS (also known as the POETICS), espec. p. 103.

== Awards and honors ==
In 2003, Banes won the Lifetime Achievement Award for her Outstanding Contribution to Dance Research from the Congress on Research in Dance. The Society of Dance History Scholars has also given her a similar lifetime achievement award and Banes has won a Bessie Award for her Lifetime Contribution to Dance Criticism.

There is also a Biennial Sally Banes Publication Prize in her honor. This prize awards $500 to the publication that best explores the intersection of theater and dance or movement and has been published within the previous two years. The nominees are judged based on the innovation and rigor with which they explore their topic and the intersection therein. The first Publication Prize was awarded in 2009.
