= De la Torre Bueno Prize =

The de la Torre Bueno Prize is an annual award offered by the Dance Studies Association for the best book published in English in the field of dance studies. The award honors José Rollin de la Torre Bueno, the first university press editor to develop a dance studies titles list. The award of $1000 recognizes exemplary scholarship and important contributions to the field.

From its creation in 1973 to 2001, the prize was awarded by the Dance Perspectives Foundation, an organization founded in 1966 to support dance scholarship. However, the de la Torre Bueno family severed the relationship with the Foundation in 2001, and from 2002 until 2016, the prize was awarded by the Society of Dance History Scholars. When the Society of Dance History Scholars merged with the Congress on Research in Dance in 2017 to become the Dance Studies Association, the de la Torre Bueno Prize transferred, as well.

== Award winners ==
=== Awarded by SDHS ===
- 2016 - Prize to Melissa Blanco Borelli for She is Cuba. Oxford University Press, 2015.
- 2014 - Prize to Prarthana Purkayastha for Indian Modern Dance, Feminism and Transnationalism in New World Choreographies series, eds. Rachel Fensham & Peter M. Boenisch. Palgrave Macmillan, 2014.
- 2014 - Special citation to Rebecca Rossen for Dancing Jewish: Jewish Identity in American Modern and Postmodern Dance. Oxford University Press, 2014.
- 2013 - Prize to Felicia McCarren for French Moves: The Cultural Politics of le hip hop. Oxford University Press, 2012.
- 2013 - Special citation to Hélène Neveu Kringelbach for Dance Circles: Movement, Morality and Self-fashioning in Urban Senegal. Berghahn Books, 2013. Special citation to Paul A. Scolieri for Dancing the New World: Aztecs, Spaniards, and the Choreography of Conquest. University of Texas Press, 2013.
- 2012 - Special citation to Ramón H. Rivera-Servera for Performing Queer Latinidad: Dance, Sexuality, Politics. University of Michigan Press, 2012. Special citation to Tilden Russell for The Compleat Dancing Master: A Translation of Gottfried Taubert’s Rechtschaffener Tantzmeister (1717). Peter Lang, 2012.
- 2011 - Prize to Carrie J. Preston for Modernism’s Mythic Pose: Gender, Genre, Solo Performance. New York: Oxford University Press, 2011.
- 2010 - Prize to Constance Valis Hill for Tap Dancing America: A Cultural History. New York: Oxford University Press, 2010.
- 2010 - Special citation to Susan A. Reed for Dance and the Nation: Performance, Ritual, and Politics in Sri Lanka. Madison: University of Wisconsin Press, 2009. Special citation to Jerri Daboo forRitual, Rapture and Remorse: A Study of Tarantism and Pizzica in Salento. New York: Peter Lang, 2010.
- 2009 - Prize to Carrie Lambert-Beatty, associate professor in the Department of Visual Culture at Harvard University, for Being Watched: Yvonne Rainer and the 1960s. Boston: MIT Press, 2008.
- 2009 - Special citation to Anthea Kraut, Associate Professor of Dance at the University of California-Riverside, for Choreographing the Folk: the Dance Stagings of Zora Neale Hurston. Minneapolis: Minnesota University Press, 2008.
- 2008 - Prize to Jacqueline Shea Murphy, Associate Professor of Dance at University of California-Riverside, for The People Have Never Stopped Dancing: Native American Modern Dance Histories. Minneapolis: University of Minnesota Press, 2007.
- 2008 - Special citation to Janice Ross, Associate Professor (Teaching) of Drama at Stanford University, for Anna Halprin: Experience as Dance. Berkeley: University of California Press, 2007.
- 2008 - Special citation to Sydney Hutchinson, research associate at the University of Arizona's Southwest Center and doctoral candidate at New York University, for From Quebradita to Duranguense: Dance in Mexican Youth Culture. Tucson: University of Arizona Press, 2007.
- 2007 - Prize to Gay Morris, independent scholar and critic in New York City, for A Game for Dancers: Performing Modernism in the Postwar Years, 1945-1960. Middletown: Wesleyan University Press, 2006.
- 2007 - Special citation to Lucia Ruprecht, a University Lecturer in German and Fellow of Emmanuel College at the University of Cambridge, for Dances of the Self in Heinrich von Kleist, E.T.A. Hoffmann and Heinrich Heine. Hampshire, England and Burlington, VT: Ashgate Publishing Company, 2006.
- 2006 - prize to Yvonne Daniel, Professor Emerita of Dance and Afro-American Studies at Smith College and 2005-2006 Rockefeller Foundation Fellow, for Dancing Wisdom: Embodied Knowledge in Haitian Vodou, Cuban Yoruba, and Bahian Candomblé. Urbana: University of Illinois Press, 2005.
- 2005 - prize to Thomas DeFrantz, Associate Professor of Music and Theatre Arts at MIT, for his book Dancing Revelations: Alvin Ailey's Embodiment of African American Culture. New York: Oxford University Press, 2004.
- 2005 - special citation to David Gere, Associate Professor of World Arts and Cultures at UCLA, for How to Make Dances in an Epidemic: Tracking Choreography in the Age of AIDS. Wisconsin: University of Wisconsin Press, 2004.
- 2005 - special citation to Deborah Jowitt, dance critic for the Village Voice and adjunct professor at NYU, for Jerome Robbins: His Life, His Theater, His Dance. New York: Simon & Schuster, 2004.
- 2004 - prize to Brenda Dixon Gottschild, Professor Emerita of Dance at Temple University, for The Black Dancing Body: A Geography from Coon to Cool. New York: Palgrave Macmillan, 2003.
- 2004 - special citation to Jennifer Fisher, Assistant Professor of Dance at the University of California-Irvine, for Nutcracker Nation: How an Old World Ballet Became a Christmas Tradition in the New World. New Haven: Yale University Press, 2003.
- 2003 - prize to Susanna Sloat, critic and independent scholar in New York City, for her edited anthology Caribbean Dance from Abakuá to Zouk: How Movement Shapes Identity. Gainesville: University Press of Florida, 2002.
- 2003 - special citation to Donald McKayle, renowned choreographer and Professor of Dance at University of California-Irvine, for his memoir Transcending Boundaries: My Dancing Life. London and New York: Routledge Harwood, 2002.
- 2002 - No prize awarded by SDHS.

=== Awarded by Dance Perspectives Foundation ===
- 2001 prize to Marian Smith, Ballet and Opera in the Age of Giselle
- 2001 special citation to Stephanie Jordan, Moving Music: Dialogues with Music in Twentieth-Century Ballet
- 2000 prize to Suki Schorer, Suki Schorer on Balanchine Technique
- 2000 special citation to John Forrest, The History of Morris Dancing 1438-1750
- 1999 prize to Debra H. Sowell, The Christensen Brothers: An American Dance Epic
- 1999 special citation to Valerie Preston-Dunlop, Rudolph Laban: An Extraordinary Life
- 1998 prize to Roland J. Wiley, The Life and Ballets of Lev Ivanov
- 1998 special citation to Ellen Graff, Stepping Left: Dance and Politics in New York City, 1928-1942
- 1998 special citation to Karl Toepfer, Empire of Ecstasy: Nudity and Movement in German Body Culture
- 1997 prize to Judith Kavanagh, Secret Muses: The Life of Frederick Ashton
- 1997 special citation to Susan L. Foster, Choreography & Narrative: Ballet’s Staging of Story and Desire
- 1997 special citation to James Neufeld, Power to Rise: The Story of the National Ballet of Canada
- 1997 special citation to Kariamu Welsh-Asante, ed., African Dance: An Artistic, Historical, and Philosophical Inquiry
- 1997 special citation to Jacqui Malone, Steppin’ on the Blues: The Visible Rhythms of African American Dance
- 1996 prize to Barbara Browning, Samba: Resistance in Motion
- 1996 special citation to Francis Spearshott, A Measured Pace
- 1996 special citation to Amy Koritz, Gendering Bodies/Performing Art: Dance and Literature in Early Twentieth-Century British Culture
- 1996 special citation to Mark Franko, Dancing Modernism/Performing Politics
- 1995 prize to Judith Chazin-Bennahum, The Ballets of Antony Tudor: Studies in Psyche and Satire
- 1995 special citation to Rebecca Harris-Warrick and Carol Marsh, Musical Theater at the Court of Louis XIV: Le Mariage de la Gross Cathos
- 1995 special citation to Carol Martin, Dance Marathons: Performing American Culture in the 1920s and 1930s
- 1994 prize to Maurice Esses, Dance and Instrumental Diferencias in 17th and Early 18th Century Spain
- 1994 prize to Susan Manning, Ecstasy and the Demon: Feminism and Nationalism in the Dances of Mary Wigman
- 1994 special citation to Sally Banes, Greenwich Village 1963
- 1993 prize to Sally Ann Ness, Body, Movement, and Culture
- 1993 special citation to Janet Soares, Louis Horst: Musician in a Dancer’s World
- 1991/2 prize to Agnes de Mille, Martha Graham
- 1991/2 special citation to Larry Warren, Anna Sokolow
- 1990 prize to Elizabeth Sourtiz, Soviet Choreographers in the 1920s
- 1990 special citation to Katrina Hazzard-Gordon, Jookin’
- 1990 special citation to Cynthia Novack, Sharing the Dance
- 1990 special citation to Irwin Spector, Rhythm and Life
- 1989 prize to Lynn Garafola, Diaghilev’s Ballets Russes
- 1989 special citation to Pauline Koner, Solitary Song
- 1988 prize to Deborah Jowitt, Time and the Dancing Image
- 1987 no winner
- 1986 prize to Alexandra Danilova, Choura
- 1986 special citation to Susan L. Foster, Reading Dancing
- 1985 prize to Jennifer Dunning, But First a School
- 1985 special citation to Deborah Jowitt, The Dance in Mind
- 1984 no winner
- 1983 prize to John Mueller, Astaire Dancing
- 1982 no winner
- 1982 special citation to Roger Copeland and Marshall Cohen, What is Dance?
- 1981 prize to Suzanne Shelton, Divine Dancer
- 1980 prize to Jack Anderson, The One and Only: The Ballet Russe de Monte Carlo
- 1980 special citation to Olive Holmes, Motion Arrested
- 1979 prize to Richard Ralph, The Life and Works of John Weaver
- 1978 no winner
- 1977 prize to Nancy Reynolds, Repertory in Review
- 1976 prize to David Vaughan, Frederick Ashton and His Ballets
- 1975 prize to Jane Sherman, Soaring
- 1974 no winner
- 1973 prize to Mary Grace Swift, A Loftier Flight
