= Debra H. Sowell =

Debra Hickenlooper Sowell is a dance historian and emeritus professor of humanities and theater history at Southern Virginia University. She retired as an associate professor of humanities in the Department of Humanities, Classics and Comparative Literature at Brigham Young University (BYU) in 2011.

== Biography ==
She received her B.A. cum laude and with High Honors from the Honors Program at BYU, where she majored in humanities and emphasized French literature. She gained her M.A. in theatre history from Tufts University, where she worked with Peter Arnott, and her Ph.D. in performance studies from New York University, where she wrote her dissertation under the supervision of the distinguished dance critic Marcia Siegel. She danced with the BYU Theatre Ballet and later with the Cambridge Court Dancers, where she studied and performed Renaissance dance with Ingrid Brainard. She took courses in dance history under Jeanette Roosevelt and Walter Sorell at Columbia University and a National Endowment for the Humanities Seminar in theatrical dance under the supervision of Selma Jeanne Cohen, who became her mentor. Cohen later edited the International Encyclopedia of Dance, to which Sowell contributed articles on Carlotta Brianza, the Christensen Brothers (Lew Christensen, Harold Christensen and Willam Christensen), and Nicola Guerra, as well as approximately 50 illustrations with accompanying captions for the six-volume encyclopedia.

=== Other scholarship ===
An active participant, former secretary and board member of the Society of Dance History Scholars, Sowell has made numerous presentations over the years on a variety of topics, from costume designs of Jean Berain to Marinetti's Manifesto of Futurist Dance. Her 580-page tome devoted to The Christensen Brothers: An American Dance Epic (Harwood, 1998) garnered two awards: the 1998 Evans Handcart Award for western biography and the 1999 De la Torre Bueno Prize's Special Citation from the Dance Perspectives Foundation. She has also received a John M. Ward Fellowship to accomplish research at the Harvard Theatre Collection and was awarded a BYU Alcuin Fellowship in recognition of her contributions to undergraduate education. She co-authored Il Balletto romantico: Tesori della Collezione Sowell (L'Epos, 2007) and Icones du ballet romantique: Marie Taglioni et sa famille (Gremese, 2016) with Madison U. Sowell, Francesca Falcone and Patrizia Veroli. Her most recent publications focus on the Romantic ballet in Italy.

== Personal life ==
Sowell was born in Seattle, Washington, to Monte P. Hickenlooper and Susan Nelson Hickenlooper.

Debra Sowell is married to Madison U. Sowell, a BYU professor emeritus of Italian and comparative literature, former provost at Southern Virginia University and at Tusculum University. Together they presided over the Italy Milan Mission of the Church of Jesus Christ of Latter-day Saints (LDS Church) from 1998 to 2001. They have also assembled perhaps the largest private collection of pre-20th-century rare dance prints and books in the United States. Together with curator Paul L. Anderson, they produced the exhibit "Splendor and Spectacle: Images of Dance from Court Ballet to Broadway" (July–December 2007) for the BYU Museum of Art. The exhibit was based solely on materials in the Sowell Collection, as were the illustrations for their book on Il balletto romantico (Palermo: L'Epos, 2007). A 1994 exhibit at the BYU Special Collections was also largely drawn from the Sowell's collection.

Among other positions in the LDS Church, Sowell has served as a ward Relief Society president and a stake Relief Society president.
