= Helen Tamiris =

American modern dancer and choreographer (d. 1966)

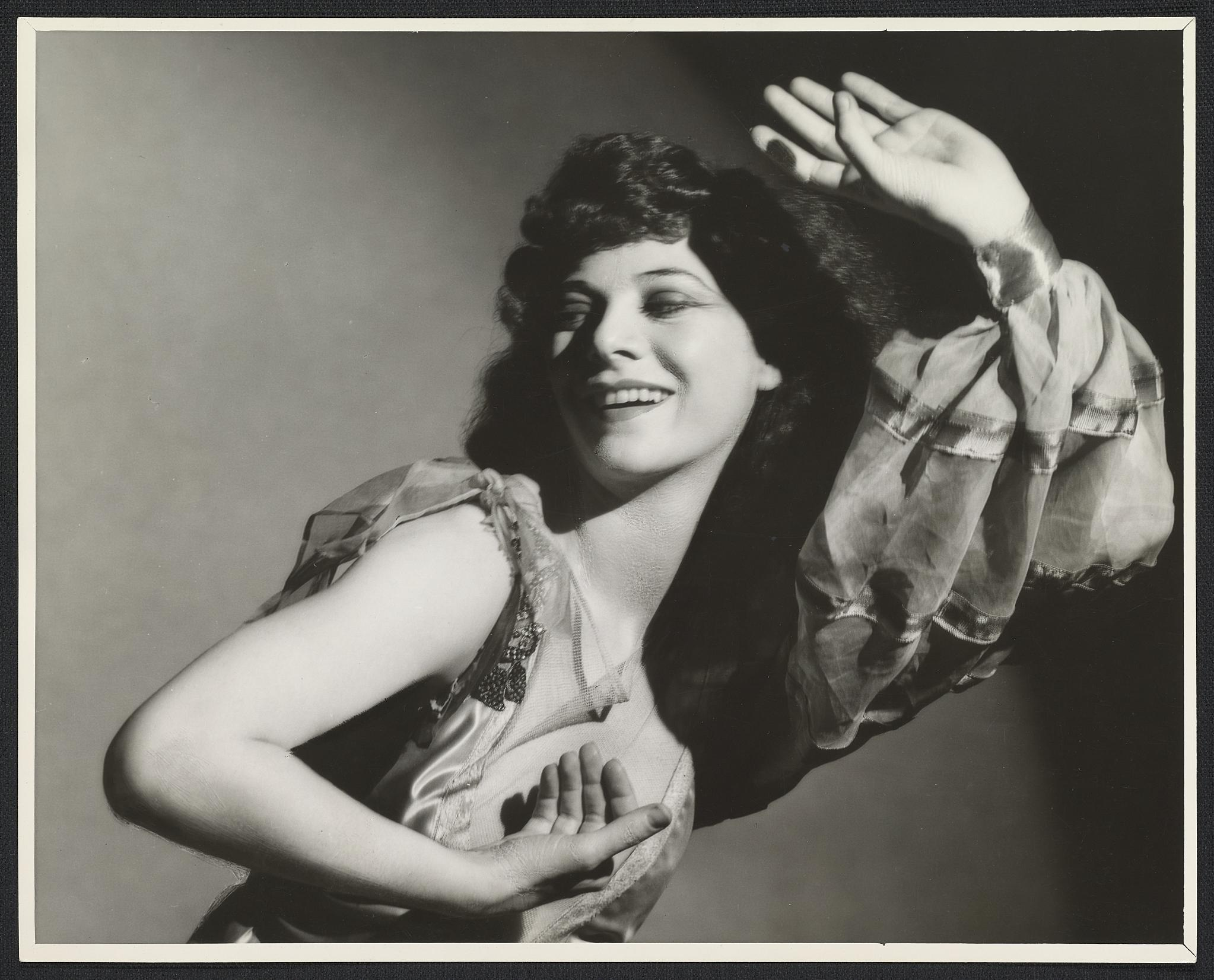
- Tamiris in a publicity photo for Adelante, ca. 1939
- Born: Helen Becker; April 23, 1902; Manhattan
- Died: August 4, 1966 (aged 64); Manhattan
- Occupations: Choreographer, dancer
- Style: Modern dance
- Spouse: Daniel Nagrin (m. 1946–1964)

Helen Tamiris (born Helen Becker; April 23, 1902 – August 4, 1966) (Note: The date of Tamiris's birth is contested. Multiple sources cite 1905 as the date of her birth. Tamiris's autobiography cites her date of birth as April 23, 1902, and her 1966 obituary lists her age as 64.) was an American choreographer, modern dancer, and teacher.

Tamiris began her studies in modern dance at the Henry Street Settlement as a child, and began her career in the field of ballet. Tamiris refocused to modern dance, making her solo debut in 1928, with a focus on social activism. Tamiris was a leader in the Federal Theatre Project and its sister projects, arguing for modern dance as an art form, and choreographing multiple productions. In her later career, Tamiris choreographed on Broadway, winning a Tony Award in 1949 for her choreography in Touch and Go.

== Early life ==
Tamiris was born Helen Becker in New York City on April 23, 1902, to Isor and Rose (Simonov) Becker. Her parents and brothers Maurice and Charles Becker immigrated from Nizhny Novgorod, Russia a decade earlier, fleeing pogroms. The family settled on the Lower East Side, where many other Russian Jewish immigrants lived at that time. Two more children, Samuel and Peter, in addition to Helen, were born in New York City. Becker's siblings were similarly artistic. Her oldest brother Maurice became a well-known artist and illustrator, and brothers Samuel and Peter took up sculpting and art collecting, respectively. Rose died when Helen was three, leaving the family in the care of Isor.

As a child, Becker was constantly in motion, and her father enrolled her in dance classes at the Henry Street Settlement at the age of eight. The Henry Street Settlement's dance program taught "interpretive dancing," an early form of modern dance taking inspiration from Dalcroze eurhythmics and the work of Isadora Duncan. The early education with the creative freedom of interpretive dance would inform her work as a choreographer for many years.

Becker attended New York City public schools, graduating from Eastern District High School in 1918, and later studying economics and labor statistics at the Rand School from 1918 to 1920. Her focus on labor statistics preceded her later works in union organizing, a key element of her legacy.

== Ballet training and early career ==
Becker auditioned for the Metropolitan Opera Ballet at age 15, and was accepted, despite her lack of ballet and pointe experience. She trained with the Met for one season, then performed in the corps de ballet for four seasons. Before her final season, she joined the Bracale Opera Company as a soloist on a tour of South America in the summer of 1922.

Upon her return from South America, Becker performed with the Met for another season, while studying with Russian ballet choreographer Michel Fokine. She then danced in a Broadway production of Casanova for which Fokine choreographed the prologue. Dissatisfied with ballet, Becker studied at the Isadora Duncan School, but left after three months. Her autobiography cited the reasons for leaving as "I don't want to be a Duncan dancer - or a ballet dancer - I want to be myself - But what was myself?"

With her independence in mind, Becker worked in commercial dance, including at nightclubs and the Music Box Review on Broadway. She took on the stage name of "Tamiris," from a line in a Persian poem: "Thou art Tamiris, the ruthless queen who banishes all obstacles."

In October 1927, Tamiris made her premiere as a solo modern dancer, accompanied by composer Louis Horst. A second solo performance in January 1928 included a manifesto in its program, detailing Tamiris's desires to keep her works contemporary, sincere, and uniquely American. This manifesto was possibly in reaction to the works of Tamiris's contemporaries Martha Graham and Angna Enters; they had performed at the same venue weeks after Tamiris's debut, and Tamiris was in disagreement with some of their principles. The second performance included two short pieces set to spirituals, the first of a series that would define her career. Tamiris traveled to Europe in 1928, performing in Berlin, Salzburg, and Paris, and furthering her distinct style.

== Great Depression and Federal Dance Project ==
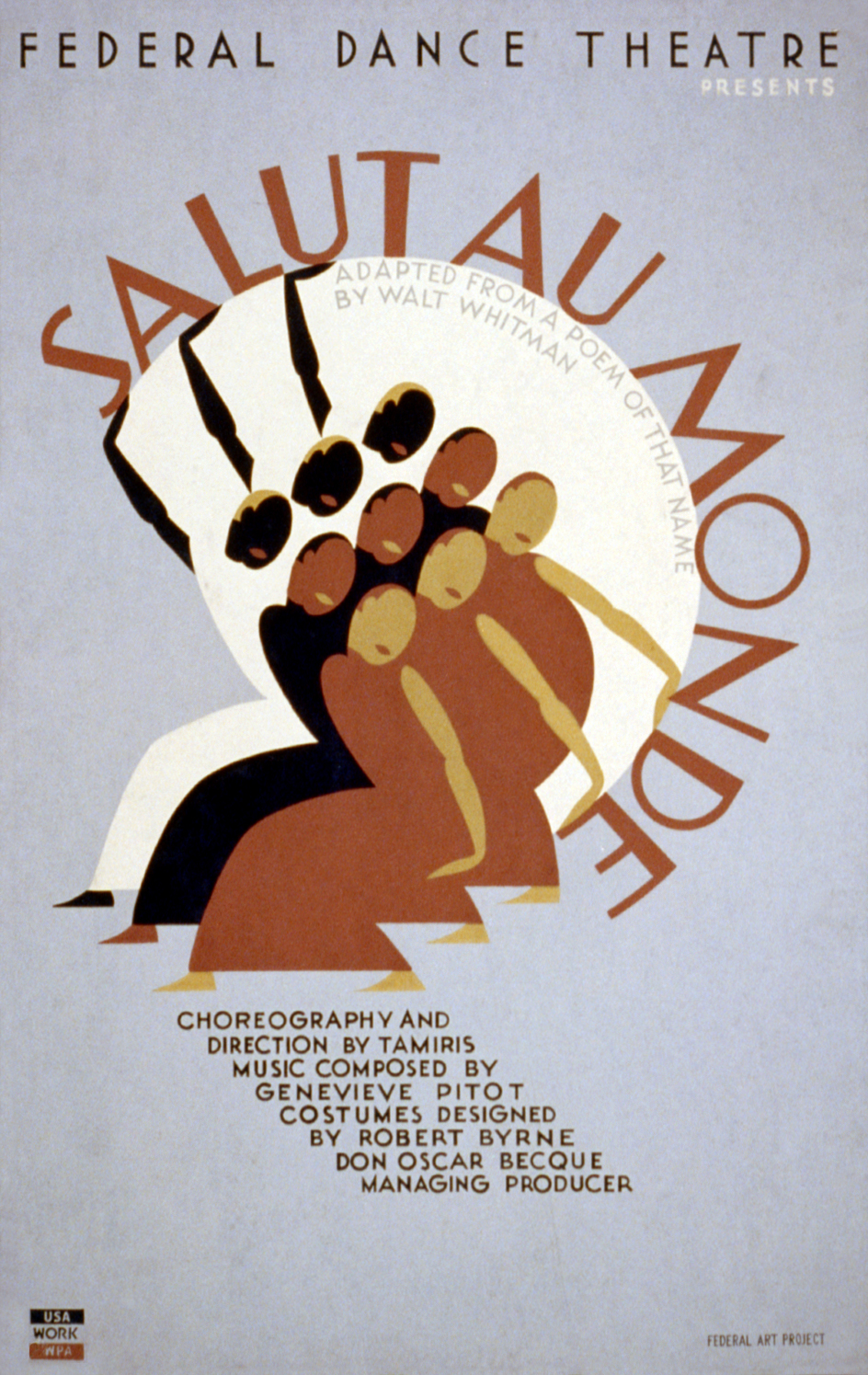
Salut au Monde (1936) was an original dance drama by Helen Tamiris for the Federal Dance Theatre, a division of the Federal Theatre Project

In the early 1930s, Tamiris collaborated with Martha Graham, Doris Humphrey, Charles Weidman, and later Agnes de Mille to form the Dance Repertory Theatre. The company was financially successful, but dissolved in 1932. Many of its members went on to form the Bennington College School of Dance, but Tamiris remained independent of this group. A 2000 analysis by dance scholar Julia Foulkes argues that Tamiris's exclusion from the Bennington College program was due to either antisemitism or backlash against Tamiris's involvement with leftist politics.

The Great Depression and the programs created to mitigate it, including the Works Progress Administration, had a large impact on Tamiris's work. Tamiris's advocacy led to the expansion of the Federal Dance Project under the WPA, and she later became the director of the Federal Theatre Project.

While working with the FDP, Tamiris simultaneously acknowledged that it was not a full solution to the issue of unemployed dancers. Tamiris wanted dancers to be understood as laborers, due to the significant physical demands of their work, and believed that the difficulties faced by dancers in the workplace were relevant to contemporaneous labor movements.

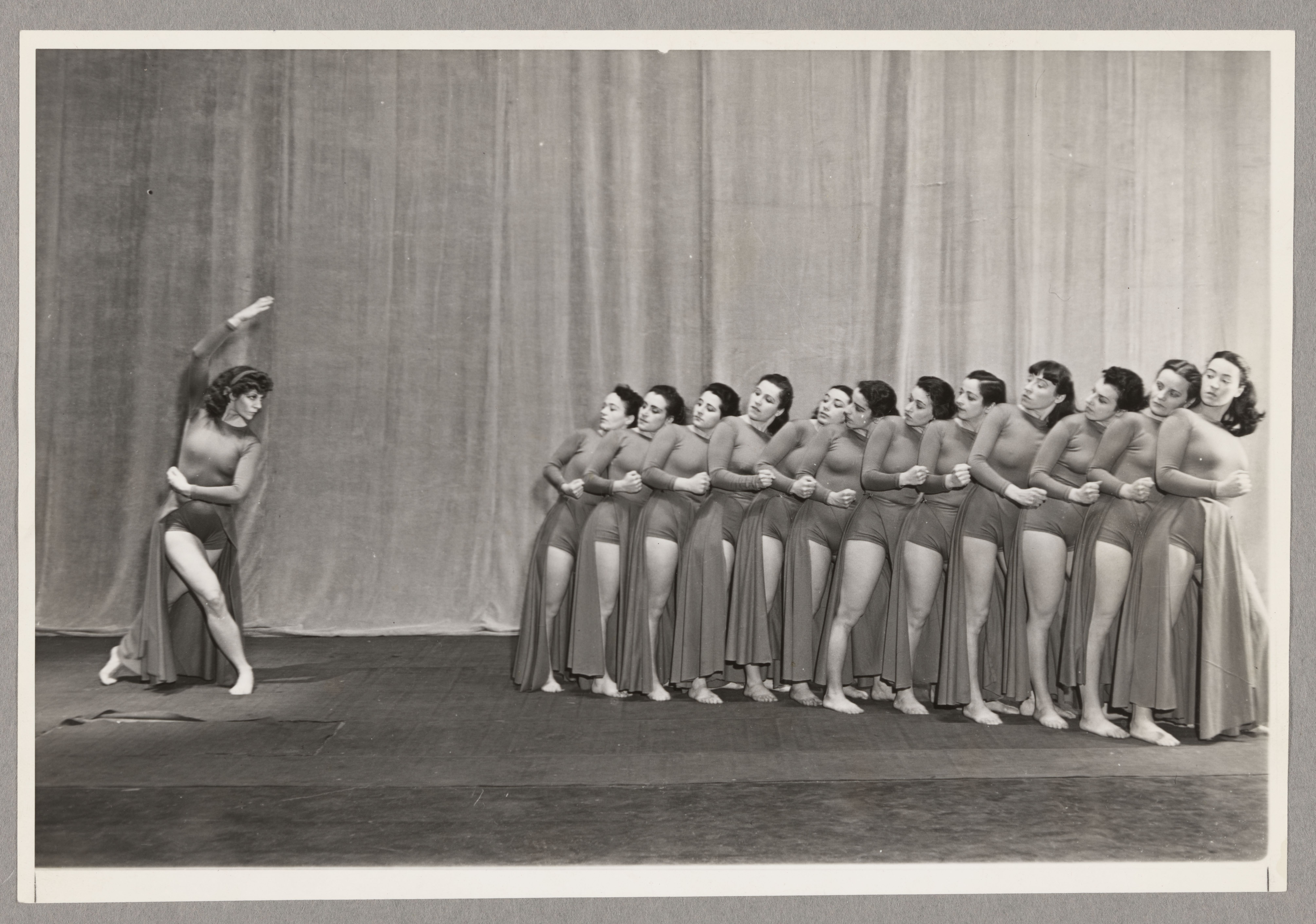
The company of How Long, Brethren? (1937)

Much of Tamiris's known work deals with social issues like racism and war. She is best known for her suite of dances, Negro Spirituals, created between 1928 and 1942. Eight pieces of this suite were performed at the Brooklyn Academy of Music in April 1939, in a program shared with Hanya Holm. A contemporaneous piece, How Long Brethren? (1937), was danced to protest songs, and won Dance Magazine's first award for group choreography.

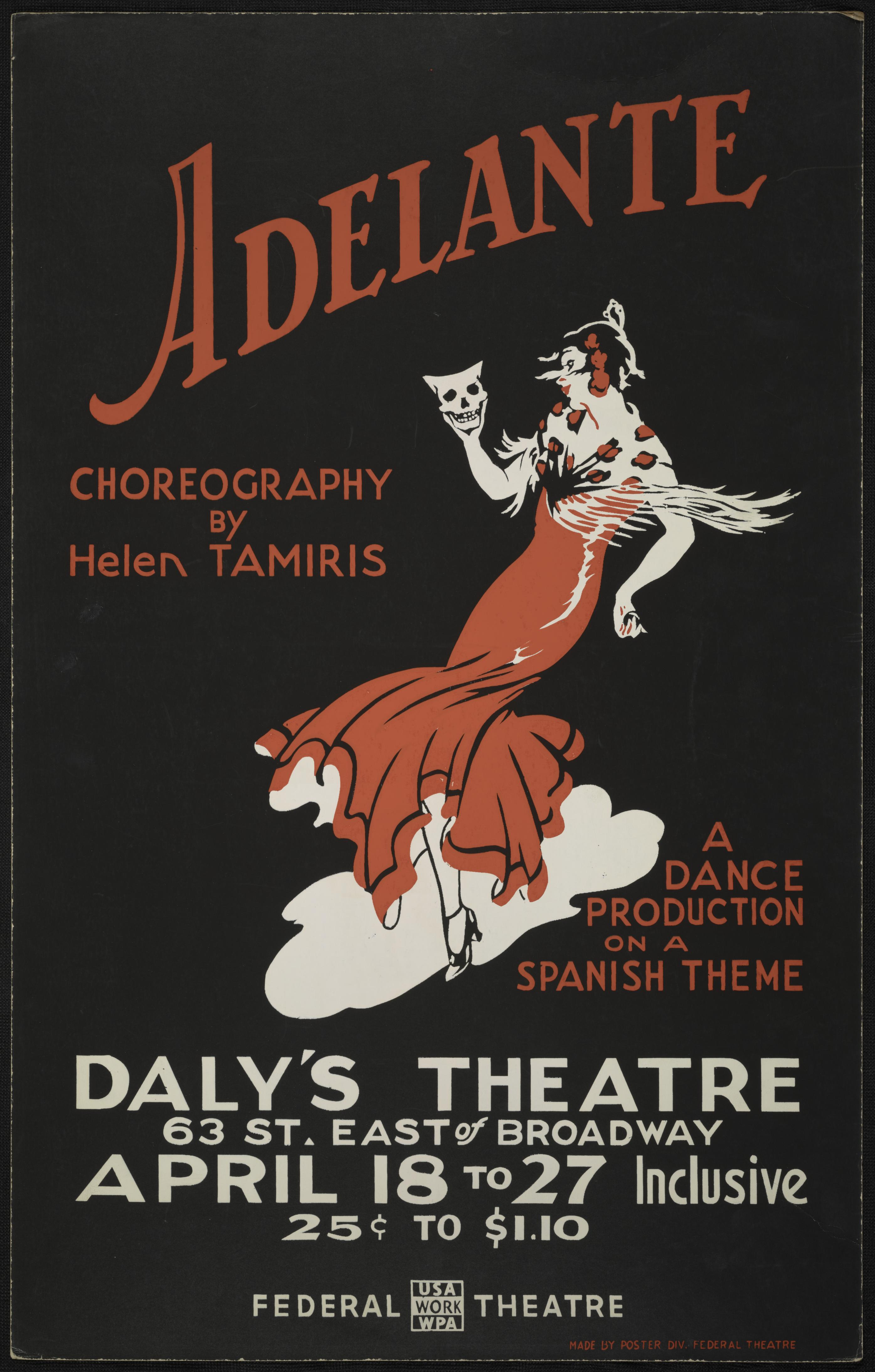
Adelante (1939) was Tamiris's final work for the Federal Theatre Project

Tamiris choreographed and danced in Trojan Incident (1938), a contemporary interpretation of The Trojan Women directed by Hallie Flanagan. Trojan Incident played 26 performances at the St. James Theatre, a short run that nonetheless drew intense attention from Broadway producers, who feared that its low ticket prices were undercutting their commercial works. More consequentially, Trojan Incident was referenced as part of the backlash against the Federal Theatre Project, which eventually led to its shutdown. The final example of Tamiris's work for the Federal Theatre Project before its closure is Adelante (1939), a critique of the Spanish Civil War.

== Musical theatre career ==
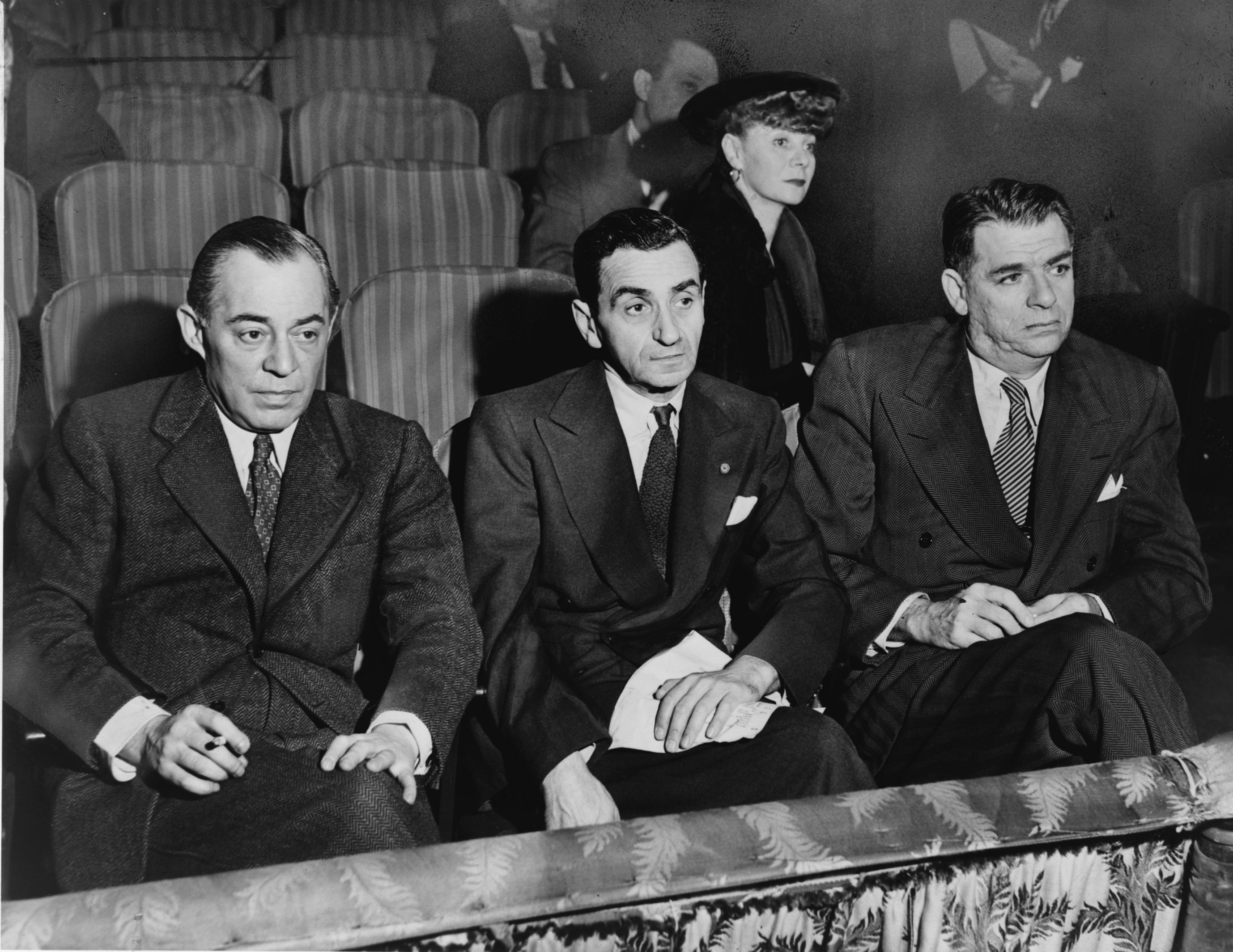
Tamiris, upper right, watching auditions at the St. James Theatre in 1948

Modern dancer and choreographer Daniel Nagrin saw Tamiris's works as early as 1936, and joined her company in 1941. They married in September 1946, and continued to collaborate professionally.

Tamiris choreographed for musical theatre in the 1940s and mid-1950s, insisting on racial integration in her casts. This, along with her earlier union organizing and antiwar activism, prompted an FBI investigation and accusations of Communism. Tamiris was listed in Red Channels in 1950, and despite an internal FBI review in 1955 denying her affiliation with the Communist Party, her legacy was likely affected greatly by the blacklisting.

Tamiris won a Tony Award for Best Choreography in Touch and Go (1949). Her other musical theatre choreography includes Annie Get Your Gun (1946), Up in Central Park (1947), Flahooley (1951), Carnival in Flanders (1953), Fanny (1954), and Plain and Fancy (1955).

== Later life and legacy ==
Tamiris and Nagrin separated personally and professionally in 1964. Tamiris was diagnosed with cancer shortly after their separation, and retreated from public view. Tamiris died on August 5, 1966, at the age of 64.

Tamiris was not interested in developing a codified technique of her own, unlike her contemporaries. Tamiris's collaborative attitude towards choreography, encouraging her dancers to utilize their "inner action," and her focus on content over form, is argued by contemporary scholars to constitute a distinct style.

Despite the magnitude of her works, Tamiris's legacy is less known than that of her peers. Washington Post dance critic Alan M. Kriegsman described her as "the great unsung pioneer of American dance." Tamiris's longtime partner Daniel Nagrin attributed Tamiris's lesser-known legacy to her intense social, political, and artistic passion, which he argued frightened her peers; and to Tamiris's use of jazz in her early works, when its legitimacy may have still been in question. Contrastingly, New York Times critic Jack Anderson argued that Tamiris's legacy was marred by personal rivalries among her peers. In a 1988 essay, dance historian Susan Manning criticized Tamiris for using white dancers to convey Black experience, calling it "metaphorical blackface".

Tamiris drafted an autobiography, but did not finish it before her death. A revised version of the draft, annotated by Nagrin, was published by the Society of Dance History Scholars in 1989. The revised draft covers Tamiris's childhood and early career, ending before her 1928 trip to Europe.

== See also ==
- Women in dance

== Publications ==
- Tamiris, Helen (1989) [drafted 1939]. Nagrin, Daniel (ed.). "Tamiris in Her Own Voice: Draft of an Autobiography". Studies in Dance History. 1 (1). Pennington, NJ: Society of Dance History Scholars: 1–64. ISSN 1043-7592.
