= Congress on Research in Dance =

Professional organization of dance historians

Congress on Research in Dance (CORD) was a professional organization for dance historians in the United States and worldwide that was founded in 1964 and then merged in 2017 with the Society of Dance History Scholars to form the Dance Studies Association (DSA).

An international non-profit learned society for dance researchers, artists, performers and choreographers, CORD published the Dance Research Journal and sponsored annual conferences and awards for scholarship and contributions to the field. The journal and awards have been absorbed into the DSA.

== History ==
The society was founded in 1964 as the Committee on Research in Dance, and based at New York University. It was formally incorporated as a 501 (c)(3) not-for-profit organization in 1969. The organization changed its name to Congress on Research in Dance in 1977. In 1991, it moved to the State University of New York College at Brockport. In 2007, the CORD National Office moved to the care of Prime Management Services based in Birmingham, Alabama. Membership generally includes performers, choreographers, artists and dance academics from colleges and universities. The official records for CORD are held at the University of Maryland's Special Collections in Performing Arts.

== Dance Research Journal ==
Dance Research Journal
- Discipline: History of dance
- Language: English
- Edited by: Nadine George-Graves; Rebekah Kowal

Publication details
- Former name: CORD News
- History: 1969–present
- Publisher: Cambridge University Press
- Frequency: Triannual

Standard abbreviations
- ISO 4: Dance Res. J.

Indexing
- ISSN: 0149-7677 (print); 1940-509X (web)

Links
- Journal homepage

The Dance Research Journal is a triannual peer-reviewed academic journal publishing scholarly articles, book reviews, and other reports of interest to the field of dance research, with its primary orientation being towards the historical and critical theory of dance. The journal was published by Cambridge University Press on behalf of the Congress on Research in Dance until the merger in 2017. Now it is on behalf of the Dance Studies Association. The journal was established in 1969 as CORD News.

The journal is abstracted and indexed in Academic ASAP, Academic Search Elite, Academic Search Premier, Expanded Academic, Humanities Index, Index to Dance Periodicals, International Index to Performing Arts, and ProQuest.

== Awards issued ==
=== Outstanding Contribution to Dance Research ===
- 1996, Joann Kealiinohomoku
- 1997, Ann Hutchinson Guest
- 1998, Kapila Vatsyayan
- 2000, Ivor Guest
- 2001, Deborah Jowitt
- 2003, Sally Banes
- 2005, Marcia B. Siegel
- 2007, Robert Farris Thompson
- 2008, Joan Acocella
- 2009, none awarded
- 2010, Stephanie Jordan
- 2011, Mark Franko
- 2012, Sue Stinson
- 2013, Susan Manning
- 2014, Deidre Sklar
- 2015, Janice Ross
- 2016, Randy Martin, in memoriam
- 2017, Thomas F. DeFrantz

=== Outstanding Leadership in Dance Research ===
- 1995, Carl Wolz
- 1996, Gigi Oswald
- 1997, Selma Jeanne Cohen
- 1998, Vicki Risner
- 1999, Ernestine Stodelle
- 2000, David Vaughan
- 2001, Beate Gordon
- 2003, Jane Bonbright
- 2005, Katherine Dunham and Anna Halprin
- 2006, Elsie Ivancich Dunin and Allegra Fuller Snyder
- 2007, Susan Leigh Foster
- 2008, Brenda Dixon Gottschild
- 2009, none awarded

(now the Dixie Durr Award for Outstanding Service to Dance Research)

- 2010, Ann Dils
- 2011, Barbara Sellers-Young
- 2012, Cara Gargano
- 2013, Sally Ness
- 2014, Libby Smigel
- 2015, Elizabeth Aldrich
- 2016, Jacqueline Shea Murphy
- 2017, Ann Cooper Albright

Other CORD awards include one for "Outstanding Book", such as one for Marta Savigliano.

== See also ==
- Timeline of music in the United States (1950 - 1969)
- American Dance Guild
- Society of Dance History Scholars
