= Judith Chazin-Bennahum =

American historian

Judith Chazin-Bennahum (born 8 April 1937) is a ballet dancer, choreographer, dance historian, writer, and educator. A leader in the field of dance scholarship, she spent her academic career at the University of New Mexico, where she now holds the title of Distinguished Professor Emerita of Dance.

== Early life, education, and training ==
Judith Helen Chazin, born in New York City, spent her childhood in Jamaica, Queens, where her father, Maurice Chazin, was chair of the Department of Romance Languages at Queens College. Her mother, Mary (Berry) Chazin, was a former high-school English teacher. She began her dance training at age eight, studying tap and ballet with a local teacher, and quickly developed a passion for ballet. When she was ten, she persuaded her mother to take her into Manhattan and enroll her in classes at the Fokine Ballet School, in the upper-floor studios in Carnegie Hall. There she studied with Frank Lester and was observed with interest by Vitale Fokine, son of Michel Fokine and Vera Fokina. Both Lester and Fokine recommended that she audition for entrance into the High School of Performing Arts, which she did, successfully, when she was twelve years old.

There, Chazin studied ballet and modern dance with Lucas Hoving, Bella Malinka, Doris Rudko, Robert Joffrey, who was her principal ballet teacher, and, in her senior year, Benjamin Harkarvy. Selma Jeanne Cohen was her instructor in dance history. During her school years, she and other students performed at various venues in New York City, and in July 1953, when she was sixteen, she went to the Jacob's Pillow Dance Festival in Becket, Massachusetts, to dance with the Robert Joffrey Ballet Company in his Scaramouche and Umpateedle. When she finished high school, her father insisted that she go to college rather than pursue a career in dance. Upon application, she received a full scholarship to Brandeis University, near Boston, and spent the next four years there as a theater arts major, with an emphasis on dance. Upon her graduation with a bachelor of arts degree, magna cum laude, in 1958, she determined to make a career as a dancer.

== Dance career ==
Soon after she graduated from Brandeis in June 1958, Chazin auditioned for Agnes de Mille and was hired for the dancing ensemble of Goldilocks, a Broadway show starring Don Ameche, Elaine Stritch, and Russell Nype. Rehearsals began in July, and the show opened on 11 October 1958. For the next few months, until February 1959, Chazin appeared in eight shows a week, dancing in seven lively dance scenes devised by de Mille to the music of Leroy Anderson. The following summer she returned to Jacob's Pillow as a member of the Pearl Lang Dance Theater, appearing in Lang's Persephone, with Lang in the title role, Dirk Sanders as Hermes, and Deborah Jowitt as Demeter. During her stint on Broadway and in the months thereafter, she continued to take ballet classes from Robert Joffrey, hoping to join his company. In one of his classes, she met Nancy King, a member of the Metropolitan Opera Ballet Company, who told her of auditions then being held at the opera house. Chazin attended an audition in the summer of 1959 and was hired as a member of the corps de ballet.

For the next several years, Chazin danced in many operas on the Metropolitan stage and continued her classes with Antony Tudor, Alfredo Corvino, and Margaret Craske in the Met's ballet school. Tudor was then head of the school faculty; Corvino was ballet master of the company as well as a teacher at the school. Both he and Craske were specialists in the Cecchetti method of teaching. Under their tutelage, Chazin was soon appointed principal soloist and was given featured roles in many Met productions, dancing the ballets of various choreographers. Tudor's dances for Gluck's Alceste, Monteverdi's Orfeo, and Wagner's Tannhāuser were particular favorites. She was often partnered by such leading dancers as Thomas Andrew, Donald Mahler, Howard Sayette, Ron Sequoio, and Vincent Warren, but she sometimes danced solo, as in Cilea's Adrianna Lecouvreur, choreographed by Alexandra Danilova.

During the summers, when the Met was dark, Chazin went to New Mexico, to dance in productions at the Santa Fe Opera. There she met Vera Zorina, who encouraged her to audition for George Balanchine, artistic director of New York City Ballet. Upon returning to New York, Chazin danced for Balanchine and was invited to join his company. After she started working with him, in 1961, she began to experience foot problems, but she worked through the pain and continued dancing. In the fall of 1961, right after the Berlin Wall was erected, she went to Europe with the Santa Fe Opera company and danced on stages in Berlin and Belgrade. The following summer, in 1962, she returned once more to Jacob's Pillow with Thomas Andrew and Company and danced in his Invitations and Images in Five, with guest artists Nathalie Krassovska and Igor Youskevitch. Upon rejoining New York City Ballet that fall, however, she found that her foot problems had worsened, and she was unable to go on the company's historic tour of Russia in October 1962. She then returned to the Met ballet company, where choreographic requirements for pointe work were less demanding than at New York City Ballet. Her next move was to Geneva, Switzerland, to be near her fiancé, David Bennahum, who was a medical student there. During her Swiss sojourn, in 1963, she took classes for a short time with Valodia Skouratoff, a former Ballets Russes dancer, before returning to America with her new husband and a new surname, hyphenated as Chazin-Bennahum.

== Academic career ==
In New York City, Chazin-Bennahum pursued her interest in French literature at Columbia University but did not take a degree. When her husband, a physician, was ready to complete his training, they decided to move to New Mexico, where, as she has noted, "the sun shines and the sky is blue." There, at the University of New Mexico in Albuquerque, she earned a master's degree in French literature in 1971 and a doctoral degree in Romance languages in 1981. She had discovered the topic of her doctoral dissertation when her mentor, Selma Jeanne Cohen, referred her to French dance historian Marie-Françoise Christout, who suggested that she focus on ballet at the time of the French Revolution (1789-1799). So began a kind of love affair for her with that period of French history. Her Ph.D. dissertation,"Livrets of Ballet and Pantomime in Paris during the French Revolution," eventually formed the core of her first book, Dance in the Shadow of the Guillotine (1988).

=== Teaching and university appointments ===
When a friend became head of dance in the Department of Theatre and Dance at the University of New Mexico, Chazin-Bennahum was asked to teach ballet technique classes, then a dance history class, and then a number of different seminars in dance. She also learned to teach French Baroque dance forms, 1650–1800, as she continued her interest in early dance. She soon rose from adjunct professor of dance to full-time faculty membership, eventually establishing courses in ballet repertoire, dance criticism, dance appreciation, performance theory, and introduction to graduate studies. In dance history, she created courses at four levels: graduate studies in contemporary dance, feminism, postmodern theory, and African-American dance in performance.

In 1987–1988, Chazin-Bennahum served as head of the dance program in the Department of Theatre and Dance, a post in which she served again in 1991–1993. In 1993, she was promoted to full professor of theater and dance, a title she bore until her retirement. In 1997, she was appointed associate dean of the university's College of Fine Arts, serving ex officio as chair of the Undergraduate Curriculum Committee and as a member of the Academic Freedom and Tenure Committee for two terms. In 2002, she was appointed chair of the Department of Theatre and Dance, a position she held until 2006, when she retired from academic life. In recognition of her contributions to the university, a scholarship was established in her name, and she was granted the title of Distinguished Professor Emerita of Dance.

=== Extracurricular activities ===
During the 1980s, Chazin-Bennahum worked as choreographer and movement coach in local community theaters, including the Opera Studio of the University of New Mexico and the SouthWest Ballet Company, directed by Edward Ambrose. In 1998, she went to Italy to begin the first of three full summer seasons (1998-2000) as choreographer in residence at the Opera Academy of Rome, where performances were given in the Basilica of San Clemente. In 2006, she organized and produced a symposium in Albuquerque on "Crosscurrents in the Indigenous Arts," featuring the Dineh Tah Navajo Dancers, Ballet Folklórico de México, the Bernalillo Matachines Dance Company, and presentations by Carlo Bonfiglioli, Sylvia Rodriguez, and other scholars.

At the national level, Chazin-Bennahum has served as an evaluator of proposals for the National Endowment for the Humanities, the Fulbright Scholar Program, and the Comparative and International Education Society. She has also served the Society of Dance History Scholars in various capacities: as president, as a member of the board of directors, as chair of the editorial board, and as program director of an annual conference. She has chaired the dance panel of the New Mexico Endowment for the Arts and has served on the advisory boards of Dance Chronicle, the foremost scholarly journal of dance history, and the Council of Researchers of Pedagogical Studies in Ballet (CORPS de Ballet) International, an organization devoted to the development and advancement of ballet in higher education. She has been an active member of the American Dance Guild, the American Society for Theater Research, the Congress on Research in Dance, the Dance Critics Association, the Society of Dance Research in London, and the Association Européenne des Historiens de la Danse in Paris.

In the course of her academic career, Chazin-Bennahum has presented papers at many meetings of scholarly organizations and has delivered lectures at numerous institutions in North America, Europe, and Asia. Among American colleges and universities that have invited her to lecture are Barnard College, Dartmouth College, Goucher College, Harvard University, the Juilliard School, the North Carolina School of the Arts, Ohio State University, Skidmore College, and Temple University. Beyond the borders of the United States, she has lectured at universities in Canada, England, France, Hong Kong, Ireland, Israel, Mexico, and Norway.

== Writing ==
Throughout her academic career, writing about dance in France occupied much of Chazin-Bennahum's time and attention. She did not, however, abandon her interest in and admiration for the ballets of Antony Tudor (1908-1987), her former teacher at the Metropolitan Opera Ballet School. He was known as the "father of psychological ballet," and Chazin-Bennahum felt a special affinity for his work. During a visit with him in New York, she expressed interest in writing about his ballets. With his permission and his blessing, she applied for and received grants to study his works and choreographic approach. Her research in London, Stockholm, Paris, Copenhagen, Oslo, and New York led to publication of her second book, The Ballets of Antony Tudor: Studies in Psyche and Satire (1994). She subsequently devoted her research and writing skills to a study of French fashion magazines and ballet costume in the period 1780–1830, to a reference book article on French dance theorist Jean-Georges Noverre, and to a book-length biography of René Blum, one of the founders of the Ballet Russe de Monte Carlo.

René Blum (1878-1942), born into a prosperous Jewish family in Paris, was the younger brother of Léon Blum (1872-1950), a lawyer, literary critic, and three-time prime minister of France. He was a winner of the Croix de Guerre in World War I, becoming a national hero, and a prominent littérateur on the French cultural scene as well as an influential theatrical impresario. In the early years of World War II, in December 1941, he was among the first Jews arrested by the French police. He was confined to concentration camps and was murdered by the Nazis at Auschwitz in September 1942. Chazin-Bennahum's biography, René Blum and the Ballets Russes de Monte Carlo: In Search of a Lost Life (2011), thus deals not only with the world of ballet but necessarily with the festering political situation in Europe in the 1930s and in wartime France. Upon publication, it received favorable notices in the French press as well as in the United States. The Blum family was so pleased with it that they wrote to the mayor of Paris and requested that a street be named in his honor, like those that are named for his elder brother. Their request was granted in 2014. Accordingly, a street near where he lived will, in September 2015, be officially designated rue René-Blum.

== Written works ==
Chazin-Bennahum has published scholarly works in both print and digital media, including six books and numerous articles, essays, and reviews.

=== Books ===
- Dance in the Shadow of the Guillotine. Carbondale: Southern Illinois University Press, 1988. With a foreword by Selma Jeanne Cohen.
- The Ballets of Antony Tudor: Studies in Psyche and Satire. New York: Oxford University Press, 1994. Winner of the 1994 De la Torre Bueno Prize, awarded by the Dance Perspectives Foundation for the best book in dance studies.
- The Living Dance: An Anthology of Essays on Movement and Culture. Edited by Judith Chazin-Bennahum. Dubuque, Iowa: Kendall Hunt, 2008.
- The Lure of Perfection: The Culture of Fashion and Ballet, 1780-1830. New York and London: Routledge, 2004.
- Teaching Dance Studies. Edited by Judith Chazin-Bennahum. New York and London: Routledge, 2005.
- René Blum and the Ballets Russes: In Search of a Lost Life. New York: Oxford University Press, 2011.

=== Selected articles, essays, and reviews ===
- Review of The Ballet of the Enlightenment: The Establishment of the Ballet d'Action in France, 1770-1798 (1996) by Ivor Guest. Dance Research Journal 30.1 (Spring 1998), 73–76.
- "Jardin aux Lilas," program text for Antony Tudor's ballet produced by Ballet du Théâtre du Capitole, Toulouse, France, 1998/99 season. Translated and reprinted as "Lilac Garden," program text for New National Theater Ballet, Tokyo, 2000/01 season.
- Summary essay on research: Orphée aux Enfers (1931), for Popular Balanchine, a project of the George Balanchine Foundation; dossier submitted in 2001 and deposited in the Jerome Robbins Dance Division of the New York Public Library for the Performing Arts in 2005. See Popular Balanchine: Guide to the Dossiers, at http://balanchine.org/balanchine/03/pc%5B%5D.
- "A Longing for Perfection: Neoclassic Ballet and Fashion." Fashion Theory: The Journal of Dress, Body & Culture (Fall 2002). London: Bloomsbury. Reprinted in Rethinking Dance History: A Reader, edited by Alexandra Carter (New York and London: Routledge, 2004).
- "Jean-Georges Noverre: Dance and Reform," in Kant, Marion, ed. (2007). The Cambridge Companion to Ballet. Cambridge Companions to Music. Cambridge and New York: Cambridge University Press. ISBN 978-0-521-53986-9.
- "A Tribute to Ivor Guest: Most Revered Dance Historian," in Proceedings of the thirtieth annual conference of the Society of Dance History Scholars, "Re-Thinking Practice and Theory," Centre National de la Danse, Paris, 21–24 June 2007.
- "Celebrating the Legacy of Antony Tudor," in Proceedings of the thirty-first annual conference of the Society of Dance History Scholars, "Looking Back / Moving Forward," Skidmore College, Saratoga Springs, N.Y., 12–15 June 2008.
- "Unmasking the Body: From Lully to the Revolution." Dance Chronicle 33.2 (2010). Review of Musique et geste en France de Lully à la Révolution: Études sur la musique, le théâtre et la danse, edited by Jacqueline Waeber, Publications de la Société Suisse de Musicologie (Bern, CH: Peter Lang, 2009).
- "Beyond Ballet in the Ballet d'Action." Dance Chronicle 35.3 (2012). Review of Mime, Music and Drama on the Eighteenth-Century Stage: The Ballet d'Action, by Edward Nye (Cambridge and New York: Cambridge University Press, 2011).
- "La Résurrection des Ballets Russes." Ballroom Revue, no. 3 (Paris, 2014), pp. 66–68.
- "The Perilous Prelude to Ida Rubenstein's Perséphone." Dance Chronicle 38.1 (2015) 92–98. Review of Modernist Mysteries: Persephone, by Tamara Levitz (New York: Oxford University Press, 2012).

== Choreographic works ==
- 1977: Dances for The Taming of the Shrew, set to traditional Renaissance tunes; Rodey Theatre, University of New Mexico; winner of award for best choreographer of a university production
- 1982: Psyché, music by Jean-Joseph Rodolphe played on period instruments; a recreation of choreography by Jean-Georges Noverre for Psyché et l'Amour (1762); Rodey Theatre, University of New Mexico
- 1982: Fêtes Galantes, music by various Baroque composers, played on period instruments; Rodey Theatre, University of New Mexico
- 1982: Before I Depart, music by Daniel Davis; SouthWest Ballet, Rodey Theatre, University of New Mexico; a ballet based on the children of Theresienstadt concentration camp; broadcast in 1986 on New Mexico PBS, KNME-TV
- 1986: The Marriage of Figaro, music by Wolfgang Amadeus Mozart; Popejoy Hall, University of New Mexico; awarded National Opera Association prize for best university opera production in the United States
- 1995: Marat/Sade, music by Richard Peaslee; Rodey Theatre, University of New Mexico; received Bravo Prize for best production in Albuquerque
- 1995: The Marriage of Figaro, music by Wolfgang Amadeus Mozart; Santa Fe Opera
- 1995: The Blond Eckbert, libretto and music by Judith Weir; Santa Fe Opera
- 1997: Dark Elegies, music by Gustav Mahler; a recreation of 1937 choreography by Antony Tudor, directed by Donald Mahler; Rodey Theatre, University of New Mexico
- 1998: Le Nozze di Figaro, music by Wolfgang Amadeus Mozart; International Opera Academy of Rome, Basilica di San Clemente al Laterano, Rome
- 1999: Don Giovanni, music by Wolfgang Amadeus Mozart; International Opera Academy of Rome, Basilica di San Clemente al Laterano, Rome
- 2000: Medea, music by Jean-Joseph Rodophe; a recreation of choreography by Jean-Georges Noverre for Jason et Médée (1763); Rodey Theatre, University of New Mexico. Recorded and issued on DVD (64 minutes, color) by Dance Horizons, Hightstown, N.J.. Includes the dance documentary Recreating Medea by Mariel McEwan.
- 2000: Falstaff, music by Giuseppe Verdi; International Opera Academy of Rome, Basilica di San Clemente al Laterano, Rome
- 2001: La Valse Infernale, music by Maurice Ravel; Rodey Theatre, University of New Mexico
- 2003: The Marriage of Figaro, music by Wolfgang Amadeus Mozart, Rodey Theatre, University of New Mexico
- 2004: Love Songs, music by Johannes Brahms; Rodey Theatre, University of New Mexico
- 2008: Eugene Onegin, music by Pyotr Ilych Tchaikovsky; Opera Studio, University of New Mexico
- 2008: Dances for Goodnight Desdemona (Good Morning Juliet), set to traditional Elizabethan tunes; Vortex Theater, Albuquerque; a 1988 comedic play by Ann-Marie MacDonald
- 2010: Le Convenienze ed Inconvenienze Teatrali, music by Gaetano Donizetti; Opera Studio, University of New Mexico
- 2012: Dances for Pride and Prejudice, set to traditional eighteenth-century English tunes; Adobe Theater, Albuquerque; a 1935 play by Helen Jerome, based on Jane Austen's famous 1813 novel
- 2014: Dances for Dancing at Lughnasa, set to traditional Irish tunes; Adobe Theater, Albuquerque; a 1990 play by dramatist Brian Friel

== Personal life ==
Judith Chazin married David Alexander Bennahum, a medical doctor, in Paris in 1963. Nancy King Zeckendorf was her matron of honor. After the birth of two daughters, Ninotchka and Rachel, Chazin-Bennahum and her family moved to Albuquerque, New Mexico, where her husband finished his medical training and where their third child, Aaron, was born. The family has been based in Albuquerque ever since. She is known to her friends as Gigi, which suits her effervescent personality. David Bennahum is a poet and historian as well as a physician. Ninotchka Devorah Bennahum has followed in her mother's scholarly footsteps and has become a well-known dance historian of flamenco and gypsy culture in western Europe.
