= American Dance Guild =

Trade association

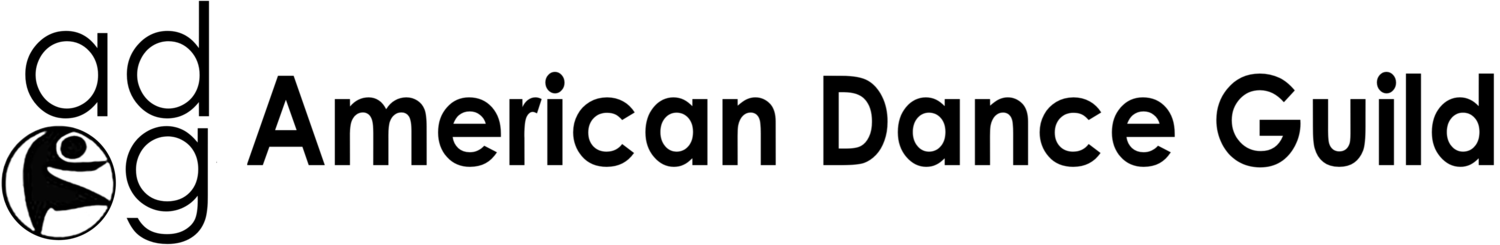
Logo

The American Dance Guild (A.D.G.) was founded in 1956, as the Dance Teachers' Guild by twelve dance teachers in New York City to promote the art of dance in the United States by educating the American public and by maintaining standards of teaching.

== History ==
After an annual conference on teaching children creatively, 12 dance teachers felt the event should occur more than once a year. The conference had provided teachers with a way to share ideas, problems and resources. The group began meeting, and discussed the need to develop standards for teaching modern dance and ballet, and the need to educate the public about dance. The guild grew, as chapters were established in Manhattan, Queens, Long Island, and Brooklyn in New York, and soon moving on to New Jersey and Pennsylvania. As the Guild grew it welcomed dance professionals other than teachers, including performers, choreographers, accompanists, therapists, writers, historians, and critics.

== Dance Scope ==
In 1965, the magazine Dance Scope was first published. It contained news of activities, reviews, and other articles sharing ideas and resources. Marcia Siegel was the first editor. The magazine was published for 16 years, before being re-invented as a bi-annual newsletter in January 1999.

== Today ==
Eventually the Guild was divided into three parts. One for teachers, another for choreographers, and one for performers. The A.D.G. helped to found the American Dance Therapy Association, American College Dance Festival Association, Dance Critics Association, Committee on Research in Dance, Society of Dance History Scholars, National Dance Association, and participates jointly with them and the Dance Notation Bureau, Florida Dance Association and Sacred Dance Guild.

== Awards and scholarships ==
- An annual award is given to honor a major contributor to dance.
- The Fannie Weiss Student Scholarship is given to promising students for summer study.
