= Selma Jeanne Cohen Award =

Writing award offered by the Dance Studies Association

The Selma Jeanne Cohen Award is a writing award offered by the Dance Studies Association (DSA) for the best graduate student paper submission to the annual conference. Prior to the DSA's foundation in 2017, the award was sponsored by the Society of Dance History Scholars. The award was established in 1995 to honor Selma Jeanne Cohen's contributions to the field of dance history, and to encourage and recognize exemplary scholarship among students researching dance. The award includes a travel grant and registration fee waiver for the annual conference.

== Award winners ==
- 1995 - Maribeth Clark, "The Contredanse, That Musical Plague"
- 1995 - Constance Valis Hill, "From Bharata Natyam to Jive: Jack Cole's 'Modern' Jazz Dance" [See Jack Cole (choreographer).]
- 1996 - Barbejoy A. Ponzio, "Mythic Images of the West and the Renewed Popularity of Country Dance"
- 1996 - Julia L. Foulkes, "Feminists, in a Way: How Women Shaped Modern Dance"
- 1996 - Ananya Chatterjea, "The Choreography of Chandralekha"
- 1997 - Karen A. Mozingo, "Fractured Images: Montage and Gender in Pina Bausch's Tanztheater"
- 1997 - Michelle Heffner, "Blood Wedding: Tradition and Innovation in Contemporary Flamenco"
- 1998 - Janet O'Shea, "Unbalancing the Authentic/Partnering Tradition: Shobana Jeyasingh’s Romance... with Footnotes"
- 1999 - Anthea Kraut, "The Vernacular Transformations of Black Female Choreographers: Josephine Baker, Zora Neale Hurston, and Katherine Dunham"
- 1999 - Virginia Taylor, "Respect, Antipathy, and Tenderness: Why Do Girls 'Go to Ballet'?"
- 2000 - Martin Hargreaves, "Haunted by Failure, Doomed by Success: Melancholic Masculinity in AMP’s Swan Lake"
- 2001 - Jonathan David Jackson, "Gender Representation in the Latest Form of the Black/Latino(a) Sexual Minority Dance Called 'Voguing'"
- 2002 - Victoria Watts, "How Do Dances Make Us Laugh?: A Comparative Analysis of the Joking Structure at Play in Tere O'Connor's Hi Everybody! (1999) and Twyla Tharp's Push Comes to Shove (1976)"
- 2003 - Yvonne Hardt, "Relational Movement Patterns: Movement Choirs and their Social Potential in the Weimar Republic"
- 2004 - Emily Winerock, "Dance References in the Records of Early English Drama: Alternative Sources for Non-Courtly Dancing, 1500-1650"
- 2004 - Danielle Robinson, "Invisible Men: The Professionalization of Black Dance Teaching in Jazz Age Manhattan"
- 2005 - Öykü Potuoglu-Cook, "From Backstage to Back Streets: An Urban Ethnography of the Post-1980s Turkish Belly Dance"
- 2005 - Juliet Bellow, "Picasso's Puppets: Petrouchka, Pierrot and Parade"
- 2006 - No prize awarded.
- 2007 - Sydney Hutchinson, "When Women Lead: Changing Gender Roles in the New York Salsa Scene"
- 2007 - Samuel N. Dorf, "'Greek' Desires in Paris: Isadora Duncan Dances Antiquity in the Lesbian Salon"
- 2007 - Clare Croft, "Photographs and Dancing Bodies: Alvin Ailey's 1967 US State Department Sponsored Tour of Africa"
- 2008 - Victoria Fortuna, "Decelerating Movement: The Identity Politics of Time and Space in Rudy Perez's Countdown"
- 2008 - Victoria Phillips Geduld, "Cultural Diplomacy and the Construction of Empire: Martha Graham's Appalachian Spring and the State Department Tour of 1955-1956"
- 2008 - Elizabeth Arden Thomas, "Moving Forward by Being Still: Anna Halprin's Still Dance with Nature"
- 2009 - Hannah Kosstrin, "Of Dreams and Prayers: Topographies of Anna Sokolow's Holocaust Work During and After World War II"
- 2009 - Anusha Kedhar, "The Specter of the Devadasi: Bharata Natyam and Indian Ethnicity in the U.S."
- 2010 - No prize awarded.
- 2011 (Honorable Mention) - Virginia Preston, “Fire in the Soul: Claude de l’Estoile’s ballet de cour, Episodic Composition and the Radical Erotics of Globalization”
- 2011 – Daniel Callahan, “Absolutely Unmanly: The Music Visualizations of Ted Shawn and His Men Dancers”
- 2012 – Munjulika Rahman, “Dancing in the (Socialist) City: Bangladesh at the 1979 International Folk in Zagreb”
- 2012 – Jessica Ray Herzogenrath, “Building National Character: Urbanization, Americanization and Folk Dance in Chicago, 1890-1940”
- 2012 – Amanda Graham, “Out of Site, Trisha Brown’s Roof Piece”
- 2013 - Jingqiu Guan, “The Protesting Arabesque”
- 2013 - Suparna Banerjee, “I and digi-I: reading the ‘digital double’ in the contemporary Bharatanatyam choreographies”
- 2013 - Kelly Klein, “Ecological Consciousness through Somatic Practice in Community-Based Performance: Palissimo’s ‘Bastard’”
- 2013 (Honorable Mention) - Priya Thomas, “Remote Choreography and the Ghost”
- 2013 - Mique’l Dangeli, “Dancing Our Politics: Contemporary Issues in Northwest Coast First Nations Dance”
- 2013 - Sinibaldo De Rosa, “Samah: Kardeşlik Töreni — A Dynamic Bodily Archive For The Alevi Semah”
- 2013 - Rachel Carrico, “On the Street and in the Studio: Decentering and Recentering Dance in the New Orleans Second Line”
- 2014 Katja Vaghi, “Deixis on Dance: Locating the Audience’s Experience in Time, Space, and Persona”
- 2014 - Anne Vermeyden, “The Reda Folk Dance Company and Egyptian Cultural Nationalism: Writing Dance as History”
- 2014 - Melissa Melpignano, “Dancing Texts: Writing the Presence of the Dancing Bodies in Dance Librettos”
- 2015 - Brianna Figueroa, “Economies of The Flesh: Scripting Puerto Rican Colonial History Through Dance”
- 2015 - Naomi Bragin, “Global Street Dance and Libidinal Economy”
- 2016 - Jennifer Aubrecht, “Rethinking Appropriation: The Reciprocal Relationship of Yoga and American Modern Dance”
- 2018 - Jessica Friedman, ”Josephine Baker’s Decolonial Corporeal Borderland”
- 2018 - Sammy Roth, “Reproducing the Foreclosed White Body: Racial Imaginary and White Womanhood in Competition Dance”
- 2018 - Natalia Duong, “Agent Orange Ecologies: Choreographing Kinship in Rhizophora”
