= Nick Acocella =

American political journalist (1943–2020)

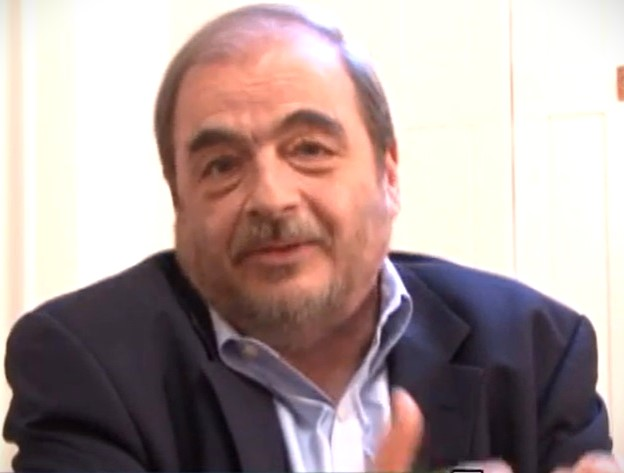
- Acocella in 2011
- Born: Nicholas Acocella; February 7, 1943; Jersey City, New Jersey, US
- Died: June 20, 2020 (aged 77); Hoboken, New Jersey, US
- Occupation: Journalist

Nicholas Acocella (February 7, 1943 – June 20, 2020) was an American political journalist and author. He was the editor and publisher of Politifax, a weekly newsletter about New Jersey politics. From 2015 he was the host of the NJTV show Pasta & Politics.

== Personal life ==
Acocella was born on February 7, 1943, at Margaret Hague Maternity Hospital in Jersey City, New Jersey, to Bartholomew and Christine (D'Orsi) Acocella and grew up in West New York, New Jersey. He graduated from St. Peter's Preparatory School, went to La Salle University in Philadelphia, and spent his junior year studying in Vienna. He then studied English literature at the University of California, Berkeley before taking a teaching job at Indian Hills High School in Oakland, New Jersey. He also went back to graduate school, attending Stony Brook University and the University of Delaware.

He was married to Laura Eliasoph Acocella, a teacher, with whom he had a daughter, Francesca Rebecca Acocella, a lawyer and social worker in New York City. He was previously married to The New Yorker writer Joan Acocella (née Ross), with whom he had a son, Bart Acocella, a political speechwriter. He died of cancer at his home in Hoboken, New Jersey, on June 20, 2020.

== Career ==
For a decade, he was the director of operations for News Election Service - "the only real job I ever had," he called it - a consortium established by the national networks and wire services to tabulate election returns.

In 1997, Acocella started Politifax, a weekly newsletter about New Jersey politics, and was its editor, publisher, and sole writer. Initially a fax service before transitioning to email, an annual subscription cost $400 for 46 issues. The newsletter's design comprised a white background with letters in a simple black font. He initially covered statewide politics but later covered local politics as well. The large number of governmental authorities in the state, with 566 municipalities in 21 counties, led to a need for coverage outside of the state's daily newspapers covering the "little battlefields" at the county and municipal level. Acocella also wrote twenty books about baseball, of which he was a lifelong fan, with one book, The Ball Clubs, comprising a history of every major league team.

In 2015, Acocella started hosting a television show, Pasta & Politics, on NJTV, where he would interview various New Jersey politicians while making pasta dishes; the show ran for five seasons. Guests included Thomas Kean, Cory Booker, Chris Christie, and Stephen Sweeney.

== Published works ==
- Dewey, Donald; Acocella, Nicholas (May 2016). The Black Prince of Baseball: Hal Chase and the Mythology of the Game. University of Nebraska Press. ISBN 978-0803299399.
- Dewey, Donald; Acocella, Nicholas (2005). Total ballclubs: the ultimate book of baseball teams. Toronto: Sport Classic. ISBN 978-1894963374.
- Acocella, Nicholas; Dewey, Donald (1996). The Book of Baseball Lineups. Secaucus, NJ: Carol Pub. Group. ISBN 978-0806517537.
- Acocella, Nicholas; Dewey, Donald (1994). The Greatest Team of All Time: As Selected by Baseball's Immortals from Ty Cobb to Willie Mays. Holbrook, MA: B. Adams. ISBN 978-1558504219.
- Dewey, Donald; Acocella, Nick (1992). The all-time all-star baseball book. Dubuque, IA: Brown & Benchmark. ISBN 978-0-697-14594-9.
- Dewey, Donald; Acocella, Nicholas; Acocella, Bart (1985). The All-Time All-Star Baseball Book. New York: Avon Books. ISBN 9780380895304.
