= Susan Manning (American academic) =

American historian

- Education: Harvard College; Columbia University
- Occupations: dance historian, academic
- Employer: Northwestern University
- Known for: scholarship on modern dance history

Susan Manning is a dance historian and Professor of English and Theatre at Northwestern University where she holds joint appointments in the English Department and Performance Studies. She is currently chair of English at Northwestern. Her first book, Ecstasy and the Demon, won the 1994 de la Torre Bueno Prize, while her second book, Modern Dance Negro Dance, received an Honorable Mention as Outstanding Publication from the Congress on Research in Dance. Manning has been the president of the Society of Dance History Scholars and is the convener for the Chicago Seminar on Dance and Performance.

Manning graduated from Harvard College with a B.A. in 1978 (student-designed major in dance studies), and her Ph.D. from Columbia University (in 1987) in a cross-departmental program between English and Theatre.

== Publications ==
- Modern Dance Negro Dance: Race in Motion (University of Minnesota Press, 2004)
- Ecstasy and the Demon: Feminism and Nationalism in the Dances of Mary Wigman (University of California Press, 1993)
