= Deborah Jowitt =

American dance critic, author, and choreographer

- Born: 1934 (age 91–92)
- Occupations: Dance critic, author, choreographer
- Awards: Bessie (1985)
- Website: deborahjowitt.com

Deborah Jowitt (born 1934) is an American dance critic, author, and choreographer. Her career in dance began as a performer and choreographer. Jowitt has received several awards for her work, including a Bessie (New York Dance and Performance Award) for her work in dance criticism.

== Early life ==
Jowitt was born in 1934, hailing from California.

== Career ==
Beginning in 1967, she wrote a weekly dance column for The Village Voice, providing frequent reviews of dance performances in New York City. From some time in the 1970s until 1994, the Voice had a page and a half for dance coverage: Jowitt contributed 1600 words or a full page of this, week after week, plus occasional features. Collections of her reviews from the Voice and numerous other publications have appeared as books – Dance Beat: Selected Views and Reviews, 1967–1976 and The Dance in Mind: Profiles and Reviews 1976–1983.

In 2007, Jowitt's column in the Village Voice was increased in length to 3/4 page, having been earlier reduced to a half-page; in 2008, her position as dance critic was converted from full-time to freelance. However, Jowitt continued to write 3/4 page reviews for the Voice until 2011. She was a faculty member at the New York University Tisch School of the Arts.

Her biography of the dancer Martha Graham, Errand into the Maze, was published in 2024. Jowitt took the title from Graham's 1947 ballet of the same name.

== Awards ==
- 1985, a special citation from the SDHS for The Dance in Mind
- 1988, the de la Torre Bueno Prize for the best book in the field of dance studies for Time and the Dancing Image
- 2001, the "Outstanding Contribution to Dance Research" award from Congress on Research in Dance (CORD)
- 2005, a special citation from the Society of Dance History Scholars (SDHS) for her 2004 book, Jerome Robbins: His Life, His Theater, His Dance
- 2025, Reginald Martin Award for Excellence in Criticism from PEN Oakland for Errand Into the Maze: The Life and Works of Martha Graham
