= Nicola Guerra =

Italian choreographer (1865–1942)

Nicola Guerra (2 May 1865 – 5 February 1942) was an Italian dancer, choreographer and ballet master.

Trained in dance by a student of Carlo Blasis, he was primo ballerino in many Italian and foreign theaters and performed in New York in The Black Crook.

A dancer and ballet master at the Vienna State Opera (1896–1901), he directed the ballet of the Budapest Opera (1902-1915), then the Paris Opera Ballet (1927–1929) and finally the school dance of the Teatro dell'Opera di Roma (1931–1932).

Preceded by Léo Staats	Director of Ballet de l'Opéra national de Paris; 1927 – 1929	Succeeded by Serge Lifar
