= Kenneth King (dancer) =

American dancer and choreographer

Kenneth King is an American post-modern dancer and choreographer and author who is best known for his experimentation with dance, language, and multimedia. King is the author of Writing in Motion: Body--Language--Technology and six novels: Bring on the Phantoms, Red Fog, The Secret Invention, So Much For Posterity, 'The Glass Pond and The Disappearing Game.

== Early life and education ==
Kenneth King was born in Freeport, New York.

He became interested in theatre and the performing arts early in life after being cast as the lead in a musical production for his kindergarten class. While in high school, King aspired to be an actor, and during college, although a philosophy major at Antioch College in Ohio, he acted in summer stock productions for three consecutive years, starting in 1959.

King became an apprentice actor at Adelphi College, and then, after attending a lecture by American dancer and choreographer Ruth St. Denis, he became inspired to dance. By the early 1960s he was studying dance full-time. King studied with Sylvia Fort, The New Dance Group, Ballet Arts, Paul Sanasardo, and he also attended The Martha Graham School, while studying ballet with Mia Slavenska. By 1966, he was studying with renowned dancers Merce Cunningham and Carolyn Brown.

== Career ==
King began performing his own choreography as early as 1964. His first work was titled cup/saucer/two dancers/radio, and featured him and Phoebe Neville. Cup/saucer/two dancers/radio incorporated his experimentation with multimedia and was heavily influenced by pop art. King went on to present works at theaters including The Bridge Theatre, Judson Memorial Church (in association with the Judson Dance Theater and the Judson group), the Gate Theatre, Clark Center for the Performing Arts, The New School, and Washington Square Galleries.

King's later choreographies, such as RAdeoA.C.tiv(ID)ty, DANCE S(P)ELL, and The Telaxic Synapsulator contained more technical dancing in comparison to some of his earlier pieces. King described the change by saying, “in the dance field there are all kinds of ways bodies make signals, or signs.”

=== Collaborations ===
King collaborated with a number of artists throughout the 1960s and 1970s. Before his dance career took off, King worked with filmmakers Andy Warhol, Gregory Markopoulos and Jonas Mekas. Some major works include m-o-o-n-b-r-a-i-n with SuperLecture (1966) and PRINT-OUT (1967). Both of these works incorporate film and projections with dance. In addition to his cup/saucer/two dancers/radio partner, Phoebe Neville, some of his colleagues included Meredith Monk, Gus Solomons Jr., Elizabeth Keen, Laura Dean, .

== Style ==
Much of King's choreographic style is based on the idea of dance being a total theatrical experience. King developed choreography with generally non-technical based movement with a newfound technological approach - incorporating film, machinery, characters, text, speech, lighting, and costumes. His works are often considered to be very personal and an overall poetic experience. His experimental dance repertoire often combines different movement styles with dramatic material, characters, and technological advances, emphasizing the importance of the human body through expressionism and symbolism.
