= Brenda Dixon Gottschild =

American cultural historian, performer, choreographer and anti-racist cultural worker

Brenda Dixon Gottschild is an American cultural historian, performer, choreographer, and anti-racist cultural worker. She has used her background as a dance performer and as a professor of dance to create works that bring racism, gender, and societal questions to the forefront of discussions. Her choreographic work is often in collaboration with her husband, Hellmut Gottschild, who is also a dancer/choreographer. She publishes literary works and giving lectures in which she uses her own dancing body as a crucial part of her presentations.

== Biography ==
Gottschild spent the early years of her career performing dance. From 1964 to 1966, she was a member of the Mary Anthony Dance Theater. Later, she became an independent choreographer, teacher, and performer. Gottschild has worked in New York, Stockholm, Helsinki, and London from 1966 to 1968. From 1968 to 1971, she was a member of the Open Theater (directed by Joseph Chaikin) and the Frank Silvera Writers’ Workshop. She was a student at the Performance Studies Department of New York University and earned her Ph.D. in 1981. Today, she uses her body and lecture as an instrument with which she demonstrates performance and kinesthetic principles.

She is a Professor Emerita of dance studies at Temple University and is collaborating with Joan Myers Brown in writing a book and giving lectures about the Philadelphia Dance Company. Gottschild performs with her husband Hellmut Gottschild in a form of somatic and research-based collaboration they have dubbed “movement theater discourse.” Additionally, she is the Philadelphia correspondent for Dance Magazine.

== Publications ==
=== Books ===
Gottschild's first solo book, Digging the Africanist Presence in American Performance: Dance and Other Contexts, was the culmination of a circuitous journey in interdisciplinary research that began with the question, “What makes George Balanchine’s ballets different from European ballet?” She originated and continue to investigate a line of thought that had been ignored in previous socio-cultural and performance studies—namely, the Africanist presence in Europeanist concert dance culture.

Her second book, Waltzing in the Dark: African American Vaudeville and Race Politics in the Swing Era, focuses on the social, racial, and artistic climate for African American performers from the late 1920s through the 1940s. For this work she received the 2001 CORD (Congress on Research in Dance) Award for Outstanding Scholarly Dance Publication.

Gottschild regards her third book, The Black Dancing Body – A Geography From Coon to Cool, as her third installment in her ongoing quest to bring to the fore the African American quotient in the American cultural equation. It is a map of American history as told through the “topography” of the black dancing body. The chapters are named for body parts or expressive attributes: feet, buttocks, skin, hair/face, and soul/spirit. An introduction preceding these sections wrestles with the question, “What is black dance?”

Her book Joan Myers Brown & The Audacious Hope of the Black Ballerina: A Biohistory of American Performance is about Joan Myers Brown and her legacy.

=== Essays ===
- Outside the Box with Faustin Linyekula
- Dance is a Message in a Cultural Envelope: Urban Bush Women, Jant-Bi, and Diasporan Dialogues
- The Diaspora Dance Boom
- Diasporan Diaries/Caribbean Connexions/Calypso & Cynthia

=== Books co-written ===
- History of the Dance in Art and Education

=== Online articles ===
Most online articles written by Gottschild are located on the Dance Magazine website.

- The Black Dancing Body - A Geography From Coon to Cool
- On Solid Ground
- Recovering the Phoenix: Dance, Education, Society & the Politics of Race
- The Movement is the Message
- In the Eyes of the Beholder
- Prince ScareKrow and the Emerald City
- Amazing Grace: Philadanco celebrates 35 years
- Generations of Inspiration
- Making A Difference
- Strengthening the Field
- On The Rise: Matthew Neenan
- On The Rise: Teneise Mitchell
- Whoa!: Whiteness in Dance?
- Drumstruck
- DM Recommends
- Balanchine in Black
- Achieving Balance

== Grants and awards ==
Year	Title
2011	Production grant from The Pew Center for Arts & Heritage through Dance Advance
2009	Leeway Foundation Transformation Award for Art and Social Change
2008	Congress on Research in Dance Award for Outstanding Leadership in Dance Research
2008	Pew Center for Arts & Heritage through Dance Advance
2004	De la Torre Bueno Prize for The Black Dancing Body – A Geography from Coon to Cool
2001	CORD (Congress on Research in Dance) Award for Outstanding Scholarly Dance Publication for Waltzing in the Dark: African American Vaudeville and Race Politics in the Swing Era
