= Janice Ross =

American professor, dance historian, and author

Academic background
- Education: University of California, Berkeley (B.A.); Stanford University (M.A.); Stanford University (Ph.D.)
- Thesis: The Feminization of Physical Culture (1998)

Academic work
- Discipline: Dance Historian, Dance Education
- Institutions: Stanford University

Janice L. Ross is an American dance historian, critic, and educator. She is professor emeritus in Theatre and Performance Studies at Stanford University. Ross is the author of a number of books, including The Choreography of Environments: How the Home of Anna and Lawrence Halprin Home Transformed Contemporary Dance and Urban Design. Her research and writing focus on how dance engaged its social surround and how voices from the margin shape dominate trends. Ross also served as an editor of Dance Magazine.

== Early life and education ==
Ross was born December 1950. She received her bachelor's degree in art history from the University of California, Berkeley in 1973. She completed a master's in Dance Education at Stanford University in 1975. For many years, she worked as a dance critic for the Oakland Tribune. Ross began her teaching career as a lecturer at Stanford University and entered the university's doctoral program in Education. She completed a PhD focused on dance education history in 1998.

== Career ==
Ross was promoted to associate professor in 2004, and full professor in 2008. In 2010, Ross was invited to the Jerusalem Academy of Music and Dance as a Visiting Professor. Assuming a leadership role with the Dance faculty, she oversaw the transfer of Stanford's Dance Division into the Department of Drama [now Theatre and Performance Studies.] In 2013, she was the founding faculty director of ITALIC, a yearlong residency academic program in the arts for first year students at Stanford.

Ross has published and lectured significantly on the lives and works of Anna Halprin and Lawrence Halprin and Leonid Yakobson. Her major works are biographies in which she narrates dance individuals' lives and describes their work in ways that illuminate the broader contours of the world they inhabit. She has also written about the role of dance education in juvenile prisons, a practice that she pursued through 20 years of teaching dance in prisons with Stanford students.

Ross has served as an editor of Dance Magazine for about 20 years and a dance critic for the Oakland Tribune for approximately 10 years.

== Critical reception ==
In a review of Ross’s Choreographing Environments in Dance Research Journal, Emily Hawk writes: “For its methodological innovation and capacious analysis linking creative concerns with domestic context, Janice Ross’s The Choreography of Environments marks a vital contribution not only to the literature on American postmodern dance, but to the broader field of dance studies.”

In a review in In Dance magazine, Marlena Gittleman said of Ross's book The Choreography of Environments, she "situates each Halprin as a choreographer in their respective field: Anna in dance and Larry in landscape architecture and urban design... Ross draws out resonances... and a bit of embodied imagination. In doing so, she follows the Halprins in modeling a receptivity to environment that invites readers to not only cognitively understand but also feel into the spaces she describes.... Finally, The Choreography of Environments tells a history of the Bay Area, one filled with tensions between postwar suburban life, 1960s countercultural aspirations, and liberal blind spots."

Doria E. Charlson in the Theatre Journal worte said the book "is an exciting project that reveals the depth of Anna and Lawrence "Larry" Halprin's co-creative processes using everyday objects... Bringing together dance studies, architecture and design, and art history, the book illustrates how the Halprins' domestic environment shaped their aesthetic sensibilities, their understanding of movement and choreography, and their ability to mobilize the ordinary as a tool for civic and societal change."

== Personal life ==
Ross was married to attorney Keith Bartel, who died in 2014. She is the mother of two children and three grandchildren.

== Awards ==
- Short list for Oscar Brockett Book Prize for Dance Research (2025)
- Dean's Award for Distinguished Lifetime Teaching at Stanford University (2021-2022)
- Honorary Fellow of the Jerusalem Academy of Music and Dance, Israel (2022)
- Bogliasco Foundation Fellowship, Italy (2022)
- NYU Center for Ballet and the Arts Mellon Fellowship (2018)
- CORD Award for Outstanding Scholarly Research in Dance (2015)
- Fulbright Scholar Fellowship (2010-2011)
- Stanford Humanities Center Fellowships (2011-2012; 2001-2002)
- de la Torre Bueno Special Dance Studies Book Citation, Anna Halprin: Experience as Dance (2008)
- Guggenheim Fellowship (2001)

== Selected works ==
=== Books ===
- Ross, Janice. The Choreography of Environments: How the Home of Anna and Lawrence Halprin Home Transformed Contemporary Dance and Urban Design. Oxford University Press. 2025. ISBN 9780197775622.
- Manning, Susan; Ross, Janice; Schneider, Rebecca, eds. (2020). Futures of Dance Studies. The University of Wisconsin Press.
- Ross, Janice. Like A Bomb Going Off: Leonid Yakobson and Ballet as Resistance in Soviet Russia. Yale University Press. 2015. ISBN 9780300207637.
- Ross, Janice. Anna Halprin: Experience as Dance. University of California Press. 2007. ISBN 9780520247574.
- Ross, Janice. San Francisco Ballet at Seventy-Five (Chronicle, 2007)
- Ross, Janice. Moving Lessons: Margaret H'Doubler and The Beginning of Dance In American Education. University of Wisconsin Press. 2000.

=== Book chapters ===
- Matluck Brooks, Lynn, Sariel Golomb, and Garth Grimball, eds. (2025). "Depths from the Surface: Interlaced Histories of New Technologies and Dance in the Nineteenth Century." Dance and Science in the Long Nineteenth Century.
- The Oxford Handbook of Contemporary Ballet (2020)
- The Oxford Handbook of Improvisation in Dance (2019)
- Ingber, Judith Brin, ed. (2011). "Jewish Culture and Identity in the Russian Ballet: The Case of Leonid Jacobson". Seeing Israeli and Jewish Dance. Wayne State University Press. ISBN 9780814333303.
- Ingber, Judith Brin, ed. (2008). Perspectives on Israeli and Jewish Dance.

=== Articles ===
- Ross, Janice L. (2023). "Made in Italy: Addressing Climate Catastrophe Through Prison Rehabilitation." TDR 67.1: 102-109.
- Ross, Janice L. (2022). "Queering the Skeleton in Dance’s Closet." Dance Research Journal Special Issue on Queering Dance Studies. 54 (2): 33-53.
- Ross, Janice L. (2022-10-21). "Ballet and the Renegotiation of Identity among Jewish Orthodox Women in Israel". Arts. 11 (5): 107. doi:10.3390/arts11050107. ISSN 2076-0752.
- Ross, Janice L. (2009). "Atomizing Cause and Effect: Ann Halprin's 1960s Summer Dance Workshops". Art Journal. 69 (2): 62–75. doi:10.1080/00043249.2009.10791346.
- Ross, Janice L. (2007-02-06). "Where they danced: patrons, institutions, spaces: Institutional forces and the shaping of dance in the American university". Dance Chronicle. 25: 115–124. doi:10.1081/DNC-120003122.
- Ross, Janice L. (2004-06-01). "Anna Halprin's Urban Rituals". The Drama Review. 48 (2): 49–67. doi:10.1162/105420404323063391.
