= Joan Acocella =

American dance critic and author (1945–2024)

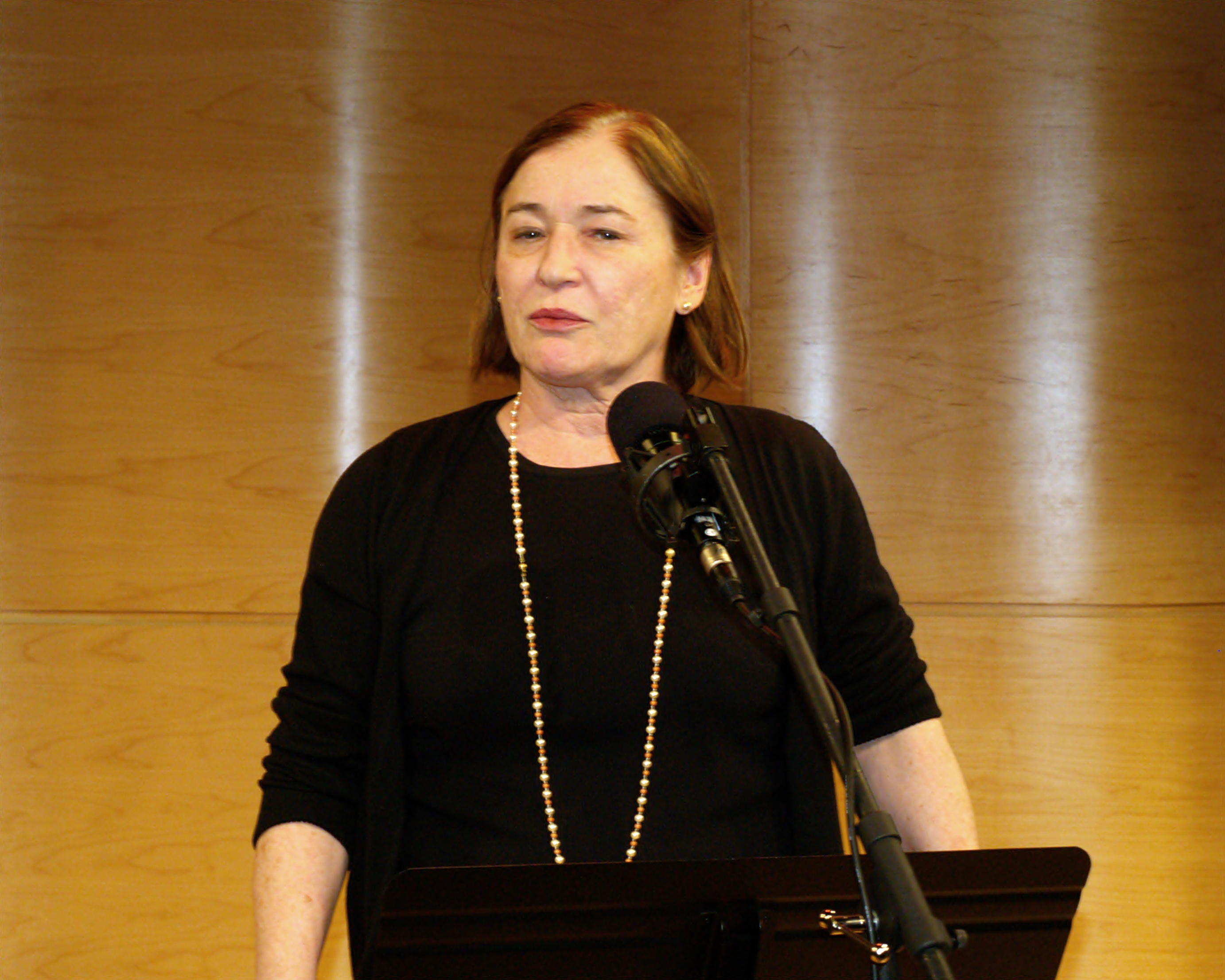
- Acocella at the 2011 National Book Critics Circle Award nominations
- Born: Joan Barbara Ross; April 13, 1945; San Francisco, California, U.S.
- Died: January 7, 2024 (aged 78); New York City, New York, U.S.
- Education: University of California, Berkeley (BA); Rutgers University (PhD)
- Occupation: Dance critic
- Employer: The New Yorker
- Spouse: Nicholas Acocella (divorced)
- Partner: Noël Carroll
- Children: 1

Joan Barbara Acocella (née Ross, April 13, 1945 – January 7, 2024) was an American dance critic and author. From 1998 to 2019, she was a dance critic for The New Yorker. She also wrote for The New York Review of Books for 33 years and authored books on dance, literature, and psychology.

== Early life and education ==
Joan Barbara Ross was born in San Francisco on April 13, 1945, to Arnold Ross, a cement company executive, and Florence (Hartzell) Ross, a homemaker. She grew up in Oakland, California, and received her B.A. in English in 1966 from the University of California, Berkeley. She earned a PhD in comparative literature at Rutgers University in 1984 with a thesis on the Ballets Russes.

== Career ==
In the 1970s, Acocella was a writer and editor at Random House, where she co-authored a psychology textbook that went on to be reprinted in revised editions for two decades. In the 1980s, she served as senior critic for Dance Magazine, including authoring a piece about her son's performance in The Nutcracker with the New York City Ballet.

Acocella wrote for The Village Voice, and was the New York dance critic for the Financial Times. For 33 years, her writing also appeared regularly in the New York Review of Books. She began writing for The New Yorker in 1992 and served as its dance critic from 1998 to 2019.

In 1997, she accompanied Mikhail Baryshnikov on his first trip back to his birthplace of Riga, Latvia since his defection and exile from the Soviet Union in 1974.

Acocella's books included Creating Hysteria: Women and Multiple Personality Disorder (1999); Mark Morris (1993), a biography of modern dancer and choreographer Mark Morris; and Twenty-Eight Artists and Two Saints (2007), which explores the virtues common among extraordinary artists. Reviewing Twenty-Eight Artists in The New York Times, Kathryn Harrison called Acocella "knowledgeable without being a show-off, meticulous in her research and energetically conversational", and said her "typical essay thus functions as a tantalizing biographical sketch, as well as a critical study, inviting us to pursue a deeper exploration".

Acocella also edited The Diary of Vaslav Nijinsky: Unexpurgated Edition (1999), André Levinson on Dance (1991), and Mission to Siam: The Memoirs of Jessie MacKinnon Hartzell (2001), her grandmother.

Acocella's New Yorker article "Cather and the Academy", which appeared in the November 27, 1995, issue, received a Front Page Award from the Newswomen's Club of New York and was included in the "Best American Essays" anthology of 1996. She expanded the essay into Willa Cather and the Politics of Criticism (2000), receiving a starred review in Publishers Weekly.

== Personal life and death ==
Acocella died of cancer at home in Manhattan, on January 7, 2024, at age 78. At the time of her death, Acocella's partner was Noël Carroll. She had one son from her marriage to Nicholas Acocella, which ended in divorce.

== Awards and honors ==
- 2017 – Harold D. Vursell Memorial Award, American Academy of Arts and Letters
- 2017 – Fellow, Dorothy and Lewis B. Cullman Center for Scholars and Writers
- 2012 – Holtzbrinck Berlin Prize Fellow, American Academy in Berlin.
- 2009 – Nona Balakian Citation for Excellence in Reviewing, the National Book Critics Circle
- 2007 – Award in Literature, American Academy of Arts and Letters
- 2002–20?? – Fellow, New York Institute for the Humanities
- 1993–1994 – Fellow, Guggenheim Foundation.

== Publications ==
- Acocella, Joan (1999). Creating hysteria : women and multiple personality disorder. San Francisco: Jossey-Bass. ISBN 9780787947941.
- — (2000). Willa Cather and the politics of criticism. University of Nebraska Press. ISBN 9780375712951.
- Hartzell, Jessie MacKinnon (2001). Mission to Siam : the memoirs of Jessie MacKinnon Hartzell. Edited with a biographical essay by Joan Acocella. Honolulu: University of Hawai'i Press. ISBN 9780824822538.
- Acocella, Joan (2004). Mark Morris. Wesleyan. ISBN 9780374524180.
- —, ed. (2006). The diary of Vaslav Nijinsky. University of Illinois Press. ISBN 9780788197772.
- — (2007). Twenty-eight artists and two saints. Pantheon. ISBN 9780307389275.
- Acocella, Joan (February 20, 2024). The Bloodied Nightgown and Other Essays. Farrar, Straus & Giroux. ISBN 978-0-374-60809-5.
