= Selma Jeanne Cohen =

American dance historian (1920–2005)

Selma Jeanne Cohen (September 18, 1920 – December 23, 2005) was a historian, teacher, author, and editor who devoted her career to advocating dance as an art worthy of the same scholarly respect traditionally awarded to painting, music, and literature. She was the founding editor of the six-volume International Encyclopedia of Dance, completed in 1998.

== Early life and education ==
Born in Chicago, Illinois, Selma Jeanne Cohen was the only child of Frank and Minna (Skud) Cohen. She attended elementary and high school at the University of Chicago Laboratory School and then went on to matriculate at the university itself. As a student of English literature, she earned a bachelor's degree in 1941, a master's degree in 1942, and a doctorate in 1946. Her doctoral dissertation was on the poetry and religious thought of Gerard Manley Hopkins, who remained a favorite poet for the rest of her life.

During her school years, when a childhood friend began attending the ballet classes of Edna McRae, a respected Chicago teacher, Selma Jeanne went along, although she had no intention of becoming a dancer. After some months of training, she realized that her small body was not suited to the physical demands of classical ballet technique, and she stopped going to classes. Instead, she found a new, intellectual interest. Encouraged by McRae, she became enthralled with reading books on dance history. It was in Edna McRae's extensive library that she found her calling.

== Teaching, writing, and editorial career ==
Upon receiving her doctorate, Cohen joined the faculty of the University of California, Los Angeles as a teacher of English literature, but after two years she recognized that her true interest lay in dance. For several years, from 1948 to 1953, she worked and taught at the American School of Dance in Hollywood, operated by Eugene Loring, a well-known choreographer and dance teacher. She then moved to New York, where she taught dance history at Hunter College and the High School of Performing Arts. During this time, she contributed articles and reviews to Dance Magazine, Dance News, and Dance Observer. From 1953 to 1965 she was the New York correspondent for The Dancing Times, published in London, and from 1955 to 1958 she was employed as assistant to John Martin, dance critic of The New York Times. In this job she wrote numerous reviews of dance performances for that paper as well as reports on sermons delivered from the pulpits in major churches in the city. She also served for a time as dance critic for the Saturday Review. In 1962, she began a decade of teaching dance history and writing at the American Dance Festival, held at Connecticut College in New London.

In 1959, Cohen joined forces with A.J Pischl, a fellow devotee of dance, to found Dance Perspectives, a quarterly journal specializing in scholarly monographs on a wide variety of dance topics. In 1966, she became sole editor under the aegis of the newly formed Dance Perspectives Foundation. The editorial board included editor and artist Karl Leabo, dance educator Martha Hill, university press editor José Rollins de la Torre Bueno, and dance critic Edwin Denby. Cohen served as editor of this influential journal until she closed it in 1976.

While engaged in her writing and editing projects, Cohen continued teaching, at the University of Chicago (1974-1976), at the Five College Consortium (1976-1977), and at Sarah Lawrence College (1977). She was named distinguished professor of dance history at Smith College in 1976-1977. During these years, she was persuaded by friends and colleagues to undertake the editorship of the International Encyclopedia of Dance, a task that would occupy her for more than two decades. She also taught at the University of California at Riverside (1983-1989), where she was recognized as a distinguished scholar from 1990 until her death in 2005.

== Later life, activities, and honors ==
Author or editor of five important books and numerous reviews, Cohen was active in many national and international organizations, including the International Theater Institute, the American Society for Theater Research, the International Federation for Theater Research, the Conseil International de la Danse, the World Dance Alliance, and the American Society for Aesthetics. In 1974, she was honored by the University of Chicago with an award for professional achievement; in 1976, she received an award from the American Dance Guild and was a Fulbright exchange scholar in Russia; in 1980 she was a Guggenheim fellow; and in 1981 she was the recipient of a Dance Magazine Award, recognizing persons who have made outstanding contributions in the dance world. It was the first such award ever given to a dance historian.

In 1978, Cohen was a founding member of the Society of Dance History Scholars, which in 1994 began the Selma Jeanne Cohen Young Scholars Program and in 1995 established the Selma Jeanne Cohen Award to encourage graduate students of dance history and to recognize excellence in dance scholarship. In 2000, she made a generous gift to the Fulbright Association, which set up the Selma Jeanne Cohen Fund for International Scholarship on Dance, intended to perpetuate her interest in dance as an international enterprise. It provides an honorarium, round-trip travel funds, and expenses for a dance scholar to give a featured lecture at the association's annual conference.

For some years, Cohen lived in Greenwich Village, a lively bohemian neighborhood of New York City. In a spacious apartment that she shared with her beloved and much-pampered cat, named Giselle, she was often hostess at informal social events attended by friends, colleagues, and students. Invitations to her annual supper party on Christmas Eve were highly prized.

In 2005, she died of complications from Alzheimer's disease in a nearby nursing home. She is interred at Kensico Cemetery in Valhalla, New York.

== Selected works ==
In 1995 a festschrift in honor of Selma Jeanne Cohen was published in Dance Chronicle (vol. 18, nos. 2 and 3) on the occasion of her seventy-fifth birthday. It includes "The Published Writings of Selma Jeanne Cohen", an extensive bibliography compiled by Barbara Palfy.

=== Books ===
- American Ballet Theatre, 1940-1960, edited by Selma Jeanne Cohen and A.J. Pischl. Heightstown, N.J.: Princeton Book Company, 1960.
- The Modern Dance: Seven Statements of Belief, edited by Selma Jeanne Cohen. Middletown, Conn.: Wesleyan University Press, 1966. The seven contributors are José Limon, Anna Sokolow, Erick Hawkins, Donald McKayle, Alwin Nikolas, Pauline Koner, and Paul Taylor.
- Dance as a Theatre Art: Source Readings in Dance History from 1581 to the Present, edited by Selma Jeanne Cohen. New York: Dodd, Mead, 1974. A second edition, edited by Selma Jeanne Cohen and Katy Matheson, was issued by Princeton Book Company in 1992.
- Next Week, Swan Lake: Reflections on Dance and Dances. Middletown, Conn.: Wesleyan University Press, 1982. A study of dance aesthetics.
- Doris Humphrey, an Artist First: An Autobiography, edited and completed by Selma Jeanne Cohen. Heightstown, N.J.: Princeton Book Company, 1995. Includes an introduction by John Martin and a foreword by Charles Humphrey Woodford, son of Doris Humphrey.
- International Encyclopedia of Dance, 6 vols., edited by Selma Jeanne Cohen and others. New York: Oxford University Press, 1998. The board of editors included George Dorris, Nancy Goldner, Beate Gordon, Nancy Reynolds, David Vaughan, and Suzanne Youngerman. The editorial director of Oxford's Scholarly and Professional Reference Department was Claude Conyers; the managing editor, who supervised the Oxford editorial staff, was Elizabeth Aldrich.

=== Periodical ===
- Dance Perspectives, edited by Selma Jeanne Cohen. A quarterly journal of international dance history, published by the Dance Perspectives Foundation from 1966 to 1977.

=== Articles ===
- "The Poetic Theory of Gerard Manley Hopkins," Philological Quarterly 26 (January 1947).
- "Hopkins: As Kingfishers Catch Fire," Modern Language Quarterly 22 (1950).
- "Some Theories of Dance in Contemporary Society," Journal of Aesthetics 9.3 (1950).
- "The Achievements of Martha Graham," Chrysalis: A Magazine of Women's Culture 11.5-6 (1958).
- Introduction to The Ballet Called Giselle, 2nd ed., by Cyril W. Beaumont. Brooklyn, N.Y.: Dance Horizons, 1969. A reprint of the 1945 edition, with a new introduction by Selma Jeanne Cohen.
- "What Does the Dance of the Sugar Plum Fairy 'Mean'?" Dance Chronicle 4.3 (1980), 249-296.
