= Society of Dance History Scholars =

- Abbreviation: SDHS
- Successor: Dance Studies Association
- Formation: 1978
- Dissolved: 2017
- Type: Academic society
- Legal status: merged into Dance Studies Association

The Society of Dance History Scholars (SDHS) was a professional organization for dance historians in the United States and internationally. Founded in 1978, it became a non-profit in 1983. SDHS became a member of the American Council of Learned Societies in 1996, hosted an annual conference, published conference proceedings and a book series, and presented awards to new and established scholars. In 2017 it merged with the Congress on Research in Dance to form the Dance Studies Association (DSA).

The Society included scholars in musicology, anthropology, history, literature, theatre, performance studies, and other fields. Many members combined research and performance, and SDHS welcomed graduate students, as well as more seasoned scholars, among its members. The society also contained several working groups, which met at the annual conference. SDHS had close ties with its peer organizations such as the Congress on Research in Dance (CORD).

Since 1988 the Society published a periodical, Studies in Dance History, which was redefined as a monograph series in 1994. It included various scholarly texts in dance history and was published by the University of Wisconsin Press.

== Awards offered ==
- de la Torre Bueno Prize
- Gertrude Lippincott Award
- Selma Jeanne Cohen Award
