= Repetto (surname) =

Repetto is a surname. Notable people with the name include:

- Amelia Repetto, Uruguayan composer
- Andrea Repetto (born 1969), Chilean economist
- Carlos Torre Repetto (1904–1978), chess grandmaster from Mexico
- Francesco Repetto (1914–1984), Italian priest and librarian, Righteous Among the Nations
- Giorgio Repetto (born 1952), Italian footballer
- Maria Repetto (1807–1890), Italian Roman Catholic professed religious
- Nicolás Repetto (1871–1965), Argentine physician and leader of the Socialist Party of Argentina
- Nicolás Repetto (TV host) (born 1957), Argentine TV host
- Pablo Repetto (born 1974), Uruguayan football manager
- Rose Repetto (1907–1984), Italian-born French business owner, founder of the Repetto ballet shoe company

== See also ==
- Repetto, a French shoe company
- Carlos Torre Repetto Memorial, an annual chess tournament in Mexico
- Repetto Hills in Los Angeles County, California, named after Alessandro Repetto
  - Repetto Formation, a Pliocene epoch sedimentary unit in Los Angeles County, named after the hills
