= Arlene Shuler =

American arts administrator and ballet dancer

- Education: School of American Ballet
- Alma mater: Columbia University
- Occupation: Unknown
- Spouse: Nigel Redden

Arlene Shuler is an American arts administrator and former ballet dancer. Until 2022, she was the president and chief executive of the New York City Center.

== Biography ==
Shuler grew up in Cleveland studying ballet. She began her training at age six under Marguerite Duncan in Cleveland and then entered the School of American Ballet in New York City. At age 13, she played the young lead in The Nutcracker with the New York City Ballet. She joined the Joffrey Ballet at 17 and performed frequently at City Center.

After a career in dancing, Schuler received her B.A. degree from Columbia University and her J.D. degree from Columbia Law School. She worked at the National Endowment for the Arts as a summer intern, which inspired her to become an arts administrator.

Shuler began this next part of her career as program administrator of the dance program of the NEA, and then worked for Representative Ted Weiss. She returned to New York to serve as executive director of Volunteer Lawyers for the Arts, and served executive positions in the Wallace Funds, General Atlantic Partners Foundation and the Atlantic Philanthropic Service Company. For 11 years, Shuler worked for Lincoln Center, first as vice president of planning and development, and then as senior vice president of planning and external affairs. She then served as executive director of the Howard Gilman Foundation.

In 2003, Shuler was named president and CEO of New York City Center. She was credited with converting the Center from what had primarily been a rental space for dance companies to a producing house that commissions revivals of Broadway shows and dance performances. Shuler started the Fall for Dance Festival, which features a number of dance companies with the aim to introduce new audiences to dance. The success of the new programs increased the Center's budget from under $10 million in 2003 to $27.6 million in 2021. In December 2021, she announced her retirement at the end of the 2021–2022 season.

In 2009, Shuler received the Capezio Dance Award, which recognizes an individual or institution whose “innovation, creativity, and imagination . . . bring respect, stature, and distinction to dance.”

== Personal life ==
Shuler is married to Nigel Redden, former director of the Lincoln Center Festival, Spoleto Festival USA, and Santa Fe Opera.
