= Capezio =

American dance apparel manufacturer

Capezio Ballet Makers Inc.
- Industry: Manufacturing
- Founded: 1887
- Founder: Salvatore Capezio
- Headquarters: Totowa, New Jersey, U.S.
- Key people: Michael Terlizzi (CEO)
- Products: Dance shoes and apparel
- Website: www.capezio.com

Capezio is the trade name of Capezio Ballet Makers Inc., an American manufacturer of dance shoes, apparel and accessories.

== History ==
In 1887, Salvatore Capezio, an Italian cobbler, emigrated to the United States and opened a shoe repair shop near the old Metropolitan Opera House in New York City. He began his business by repairing theatrical shoes for the Met, and transitioned from cobbler to shoemaker when he created a fine pair of shoes for Polish tenor Jean de Reszke in an emergency. His shop soon became a meeting place for dancers who would stop by to discuss their needs and purchase his shoes.

Over time, his reputation grew and visiting dancers would often come to his shop to purchase shoes. One of those visitors, Anna Pavlova, purchased Capezio pointe shoes for herself and her entire company during her first tour of the United States in 1910, thereby helping Capezio establish wide public visibility.

From 1940, Ben Sommers was president of the company until his death in 1985. He used his position to promote and support dance and performance art, establishing events such as National Dance Week in 1978 and in 1957, the Capezio Dance Award. Under Sommers's tenure, in 1941, Lord & Taylor, Neiman-Marcus, and other stores began to market and distribute Capezio footwear.

Salvatore Capezio's family eventually joined him in the business, and today the company is operated by third- and fourth-generation family members. The company now employs modern, computerized manufacturing systems, though its Special Make-up Department continues to hand craft special order footwear

In 2017, Lynn Shanahan became the first non-family CEO of Capezio.

== Notable users ==
Numerous celebrities endorsed the company's products over the years, such as Fred Astaire, Gene Kelly, Sammy Davis Jr., Alicia Alonso, Bob Fosse, Gregory Hines, Mick Jagger, Liza Minnelli, Ben Vereen, David Lee Roth, Madonna, Justin Timberlake, Gwen Stefani, Britney Spears, Katy Perry, Lady Gaga and Maddie Ziegler.

== Capezio Dance Award ==
The company established the "Capezio Dance Award" in 1952 to recognize significant achievements in dance. In 1953 it created the Capezio Foundation to administer the awards program and operate a grant program for non-profit organizations.

Award recipients

- 1952: Zachary Solov
- 1953: Lincoln Kirstein
- 1954: Doris Humphrey
- 1955: Louis Horst
- 1956: Genevieve Oswald
- 1957: Ted Shawn
- 1958: Alexandra Danilova
- 1959: Sol Hurok
- 1960: Martha Graham
- 1961: Ruth St. Denis
- 1962: Barbara Karinska
- 1963: Donald McKayle
- 1964: José Limón
- 1965: Maria Tallchief
- 1966: Agnes de Mille
- 1967: Paul Taylor (choreographer)
- 1968: Lucia Chase
- 1969: John Martin (dance critic)
- 1970: William Kolodney
- 1971: Arthur Mitchell
- 1972: La Meri, Reginald Laubin, Gladys Laubin
- 1973: Isadora Bennett
- 1974: Robert Joffrey
- 1975: Robert Augustine Irving
- 1976: Jerome Robbins
- 1977: Merce Cunningham
- 1978: Hanya Holm
- 1979: Alvin Ailey
- 1980: Walter Terry
- 1981: Dorothy Alexander
- 1982: Alwin Nikolais
- 1983: Harvey Lichtenstein
- 1984: Willam Christensen, Lew Christensen, Harold Christiansen
- 1985: Doris Hering
- 1986: Antony Tudor
- 1987: Fred Astaire, Bob Fosse, Rudolf Nureyev, Jac Venza
- 1988: Charles "Honi" Coles
- 1989: Edward Villella
- 1990: Jacques d'Amboise
- 1991: John Curry, Katherine Dunham, Darci Kistler, Igor Youskevitch
- 1992: Frederic Franklin
- 1993: Dance/USA
- 1994: Urban Bush Women
- 1995: Bruce Marks
- 1996: Charles L. Reinhart
- 1997: Mark Morris
- 1998: Jacob's Pillow Foundation trustees
- 1999: Bella Lewitsky
- 2000: David R. White
- 2001: Career Transition for Dancers
- 2002: Michael M. Kaiser
- 2003: Alvin Ailey American Dance Theater
- 2004: Savion Glover
- 2005: Suzanne Farrell
- 2006: Donald Saddler
- 2007: Carmen de Lavallade
- 2008: Chuck Davis
- 2009: Arlene Shuler
- 2010: Trisha Brown
- 2011: Desmond Richardson
- 2012: Tommy Tune
- 2013: Twyla Tharp
- 2014: Cynthia Gregory
- 2015: Juilliard School
- 2018: Debbie Allen, David Parsons, Michelle Dorrance, Mr. Wiggles, Wendy Whelan

== Capezio A.C.E. Awards ==
The Capezio A.C.E. Awards competition ran from 2009–2021 and recognized influential choreographers. Around 150 to 250 choreographers applied each year and 15 finalists were selected to compete for winner, 1st runner-up, and 2nd runner-up. Monetary prizes are awarded to help fund the choreographers next piece, respectively, $15,000, $5,000, and $3,000. All styles of dance are represented, including tap, jazz, ballet, modern, lyrical, and musical theater.

Award Recipients and Winning Pieces:

- 2009: Travis Wall, "Its Gonna Be A Long Walk"
- 2010: Peter Chu
- 2011: Al Blackstone, "Brown Eyed Girl"
- 2012: Melinda Sullivan, "Something More"
- 2013: Erica Sobol, "Black Flies/Heavy Skies"
- 2014: Talia Favia, "The Difference Between Actions and Words"
- 2015: Kristen Russell, "Islands"
- 2016: Martha Nichols, "Tilted"
- 2017: Will Johnstone and Marissa Osato, "Peel"
- 2018: Mary Grace McNally, "Not For Picking"
- 2020: Grayson McGuire and Shiori Kamijo, "Boots" (Note: COVID affected this competition. All entries were pre-recorded performances.)
- 2021: Taylor Tsvyetkov, "You Broke Me First"
