= Ballet flat =

Fashion shoe inspired by women's ballet dance shoes

Ballet flats

Ballet flats or ballet pumps are a style of shoe. The appearance is inspired by women's ballet shoes, with a very thin heel or the appearance of no heel at all.

Ballet flats are fashionably versatile as they are often worn with both formal and casual attire.

== History ==
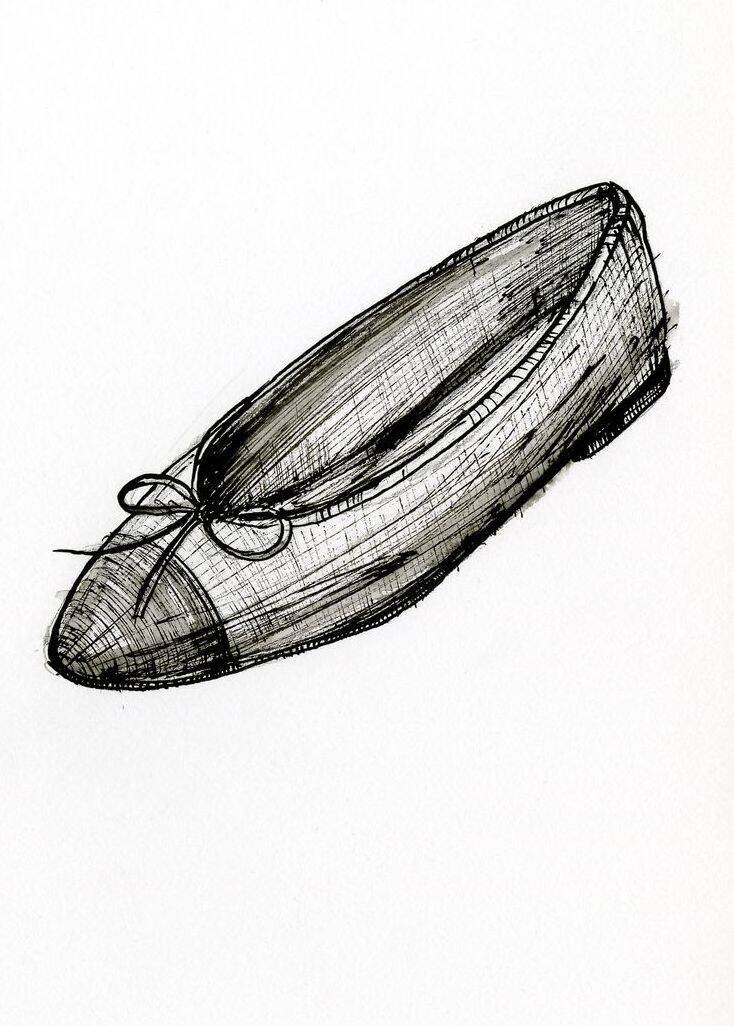
Sketch of a ballet flat with a contrasting toe

Shoes with a similar shape to the ballet flat have existed since at least the sixteenth century, when men wore a similar shoe, then known as pompes.

In medieval times, ballet flats were popular with both men and women. They went out of fashion in the seventeenth and eighteenth centuries when the high-heeled shoe came into fashion after Catherine de' Medici requested that her cobbler add 5 cm (2 inches) to her wedding shoes. Heels lost popularity quickly after Marie Antoinette walked to the guillotine in a pair of heels. Functional shoes, such as sandals, boots, and flat shoes, prevailed in the nineteenth century.

In the 20th century, American fashion designer Claire McCardell commissioned Salvatore Capezio to make ballet flats with rubber soles in fabrics matching her designs, creating the modern ballet flat. They were displayed at an exhibition of twenty years of McCardell's garments at the Frank Perls Gallery in Beverly Hills in April 1953.

In 1947, Rose Repetto hand stitched her first ballet flat for her son, famous dancer and choreographer, Roland Petit. Once actress Brigitte Bardot donned a pair of Repetto's flats, variations of ballet flats became popular and returned as a fashion trend. Repetto flats continue to be made and are designed for outdoor wear, using a variety of fabrics and usually with a rubber sole. In 1957, Audrey Hepburn wore ballet flats with cigarette pants in Funny Face, which also raised a wave of popularity.

Some dance schools allow ballet flats as part of their uniform requirements and some school bands require black ballet flats as part of the dress requirements for performances.

Around 2005-2010 ballet pumps became highly fashionable, popularised by the wear of top models including Sienna Miller, Kate Moss and Mischa Barton. The trend had a revival in 2022, included in the "ballet and trench" style.

== Health concerns ==
A condition known as "turf toe", where the joint of the big toe becomes inflamed due to strain, is associated with wearing ballet flats to walk on hard surfaces due to the lack of support and shock absorption in the shoe combined with the way a foot's natural shape is contorted to fit within the toe box. Fashion writers advised wearing them sparingly.

== Gallery ==
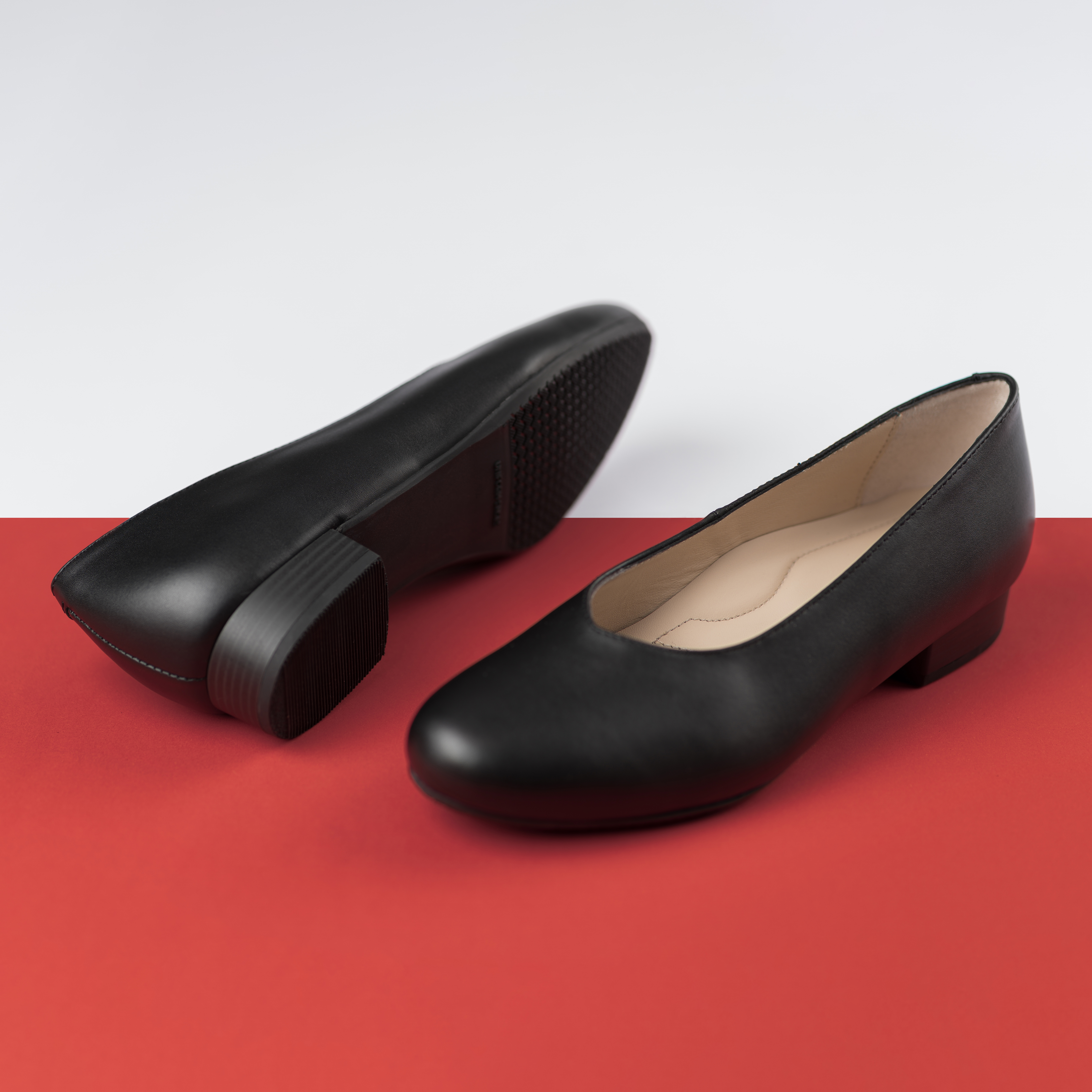
Plain black

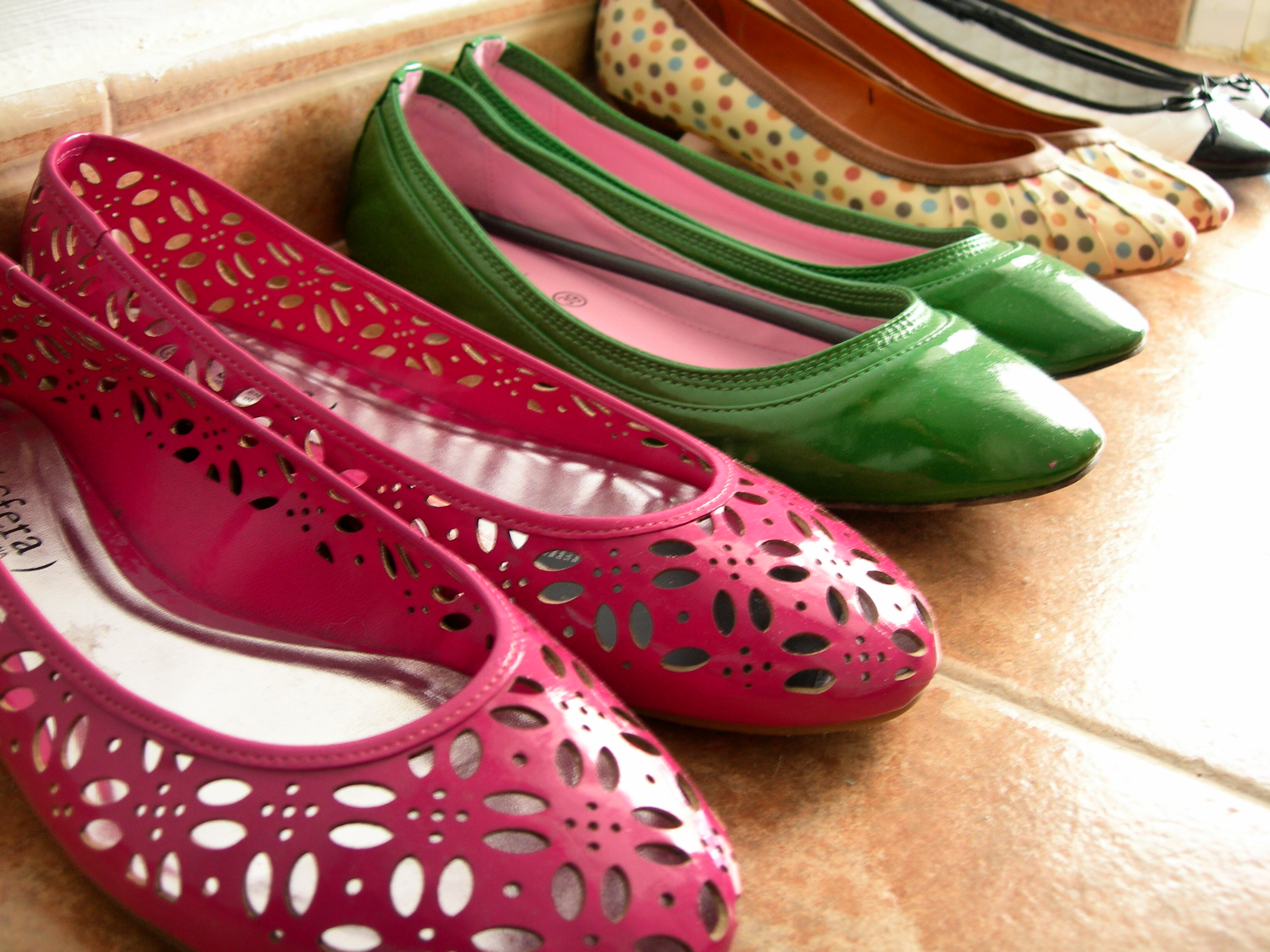
Ballet flats featuring a cutout design

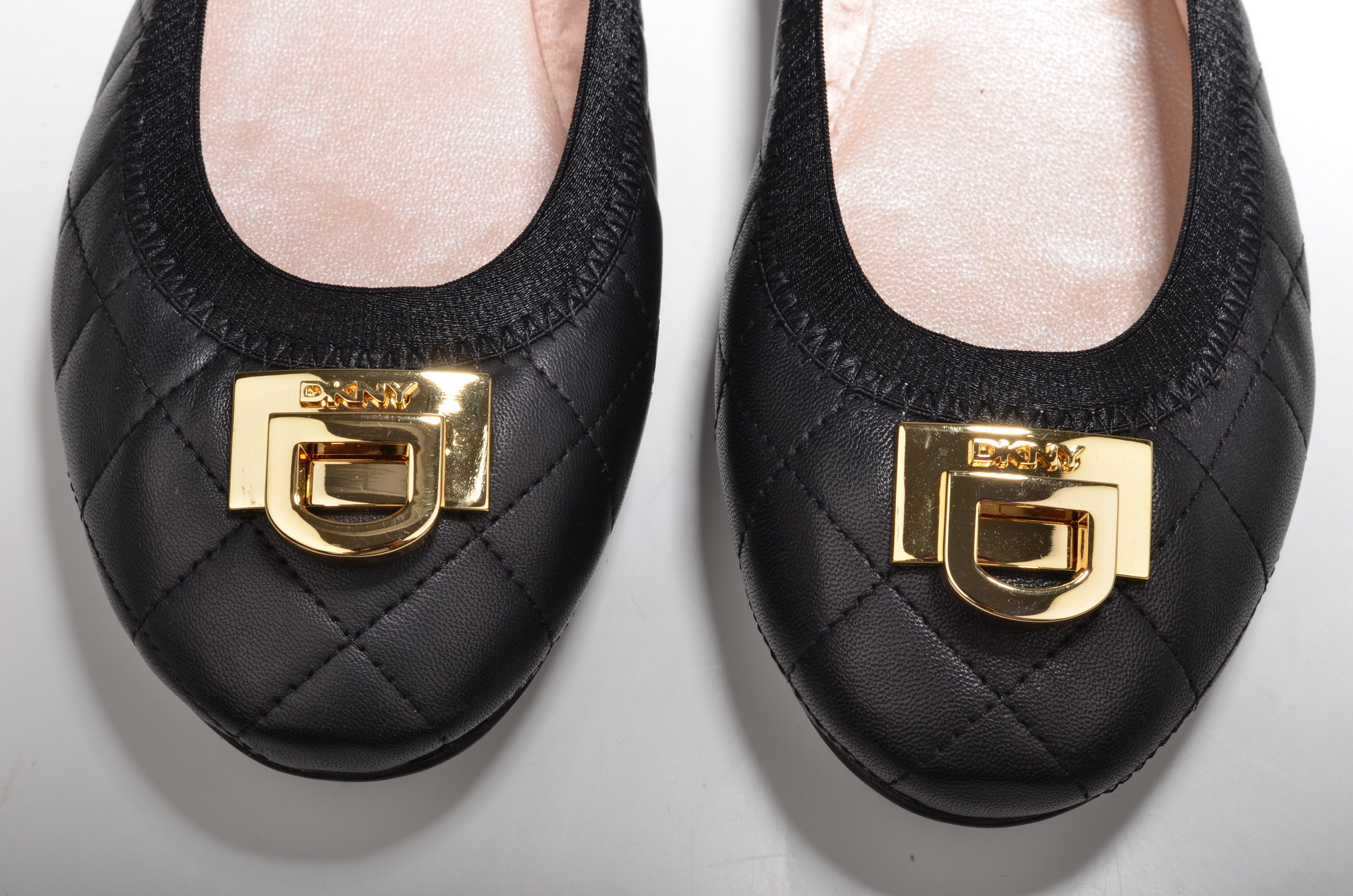
Embellishments on toe

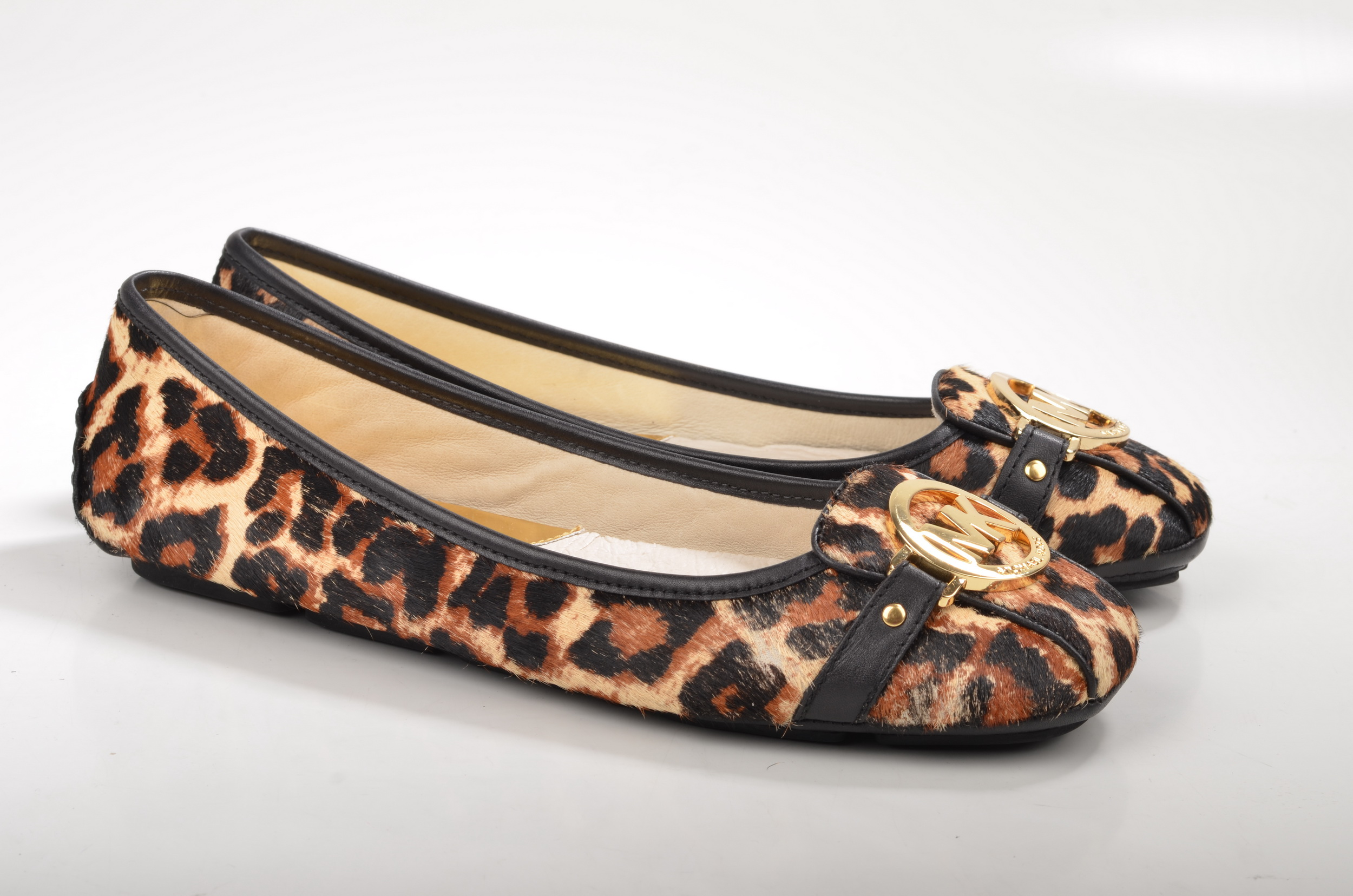
Prints or solids

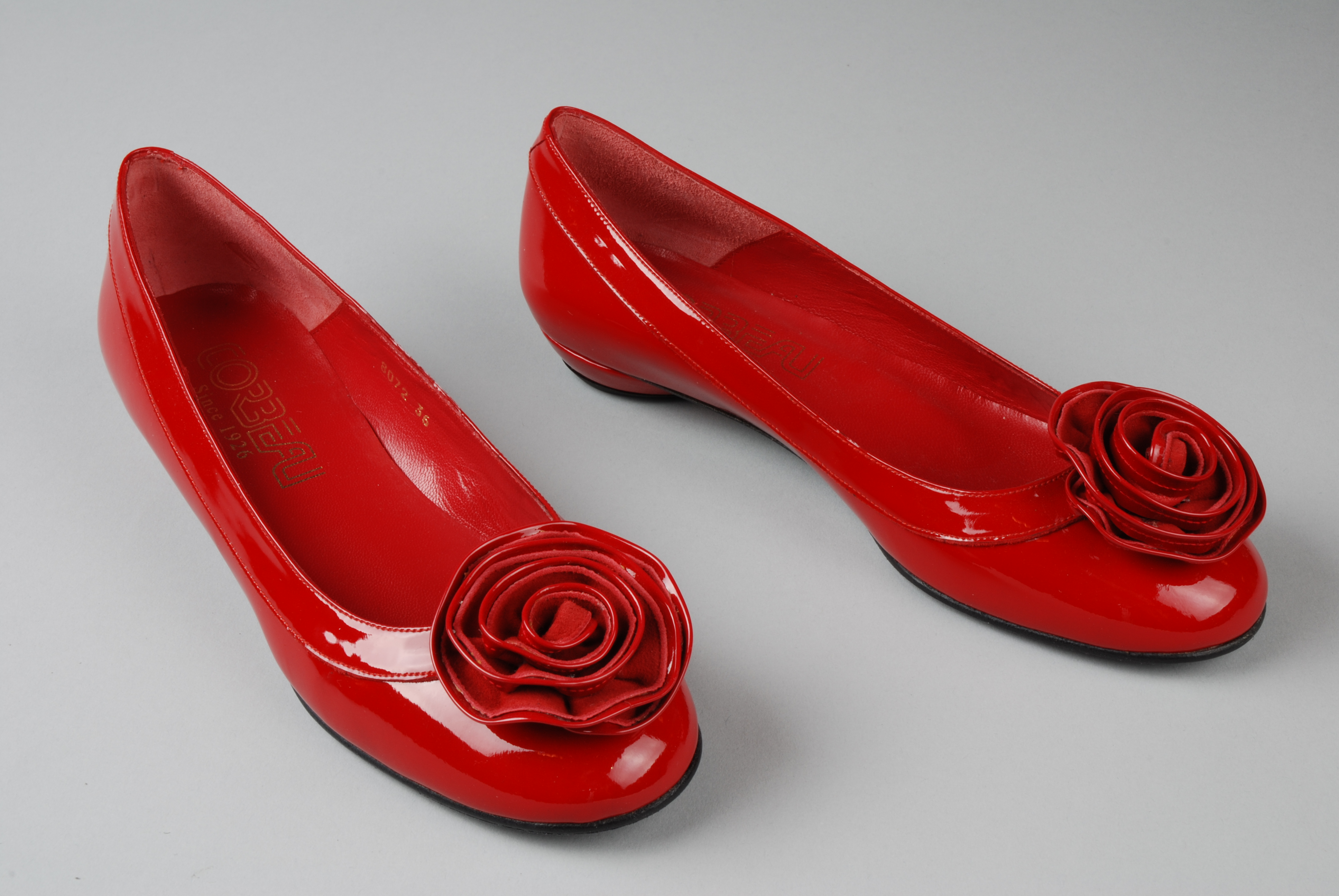
Bright red

== See also ==
- List of shoe styles
