= Ben Sommers =

American businessman

- Ben Sommers in 1953.
- Born: December 1, 1906; New York City, US
- Died: April 30, 1985 (aged 79); New York City, US
- Awards: Coty Award, Neiman Marcus Fashion Award

Ben Sommers (1906–1985) was a leading philanthropic figure in the world of dance, and president of the Capezio dance and theatre shoe company from 1940 to his death. He established the Capezio Foundation in 1951, which focused on dance, especially the regional ballet movement. In 1957, he founded the Capezio Awards which recognise the lifetime achievements of those in dance, including Martha Graham, Jerome Robbins, Alvin Ailey and Agnes de Mille. Sommers was also founder of the Association of American Dance Companies. In 1978, the same year he managed to persuade the United States Postal Service to issue stamps commemorating dance, he established National Dance Week, followed by International Dance Week in 1985.

Born in New York City, Sommers became a stock boy at Capezio at the age of 14 and worked his way up to become company president in 1940. One of his earliest achievements was supplying shoes to the 1923 Ziegfeld Follies production.

In 1962 Sommers married Estelle Loshin, née Goldstein, (1919–1994). Like him, she was a dancewear specialist who in 1947 transformed her first husband's store, Loshin's, into a retailer of leotards and other outfits. From 1964 to 1975 Estelle managed the Capezio Fashion Shop, where she innovated spandex bodywear, and from 1970 until her death in 1994 she was vice president and head administrator for the Capezio Dance-Theatre shops.

Sommers died at Lenox Hill Hospital on 30 April 1985, after suffering a heart attack shortly after attending that year's Capezio Awards.
