= Guido Santórsola =

Brazilian-Uruguayan composer and musician

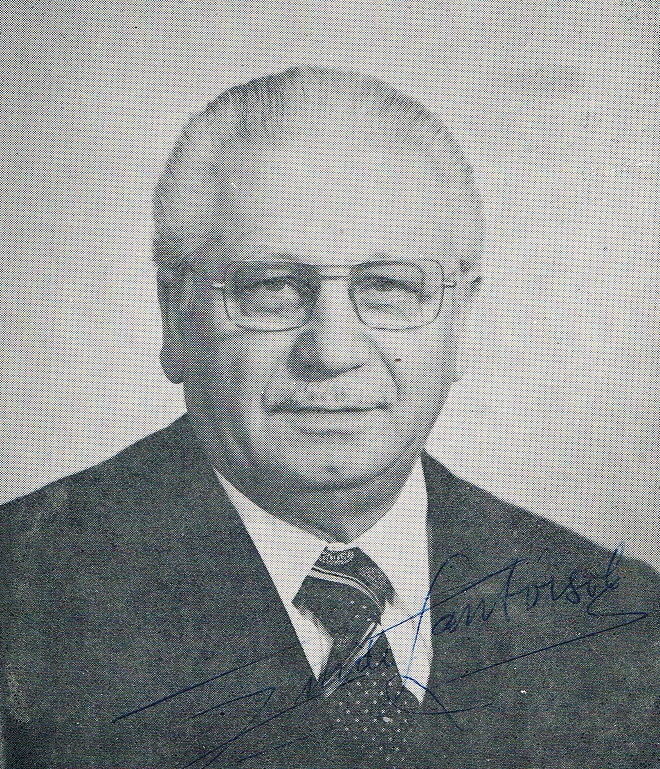
Guido Santórsola

Guido Antonio Santórsola di Bari Bruno (18 November 1904 in Canosa di Puglia, Italy – 24 September 1994 in Montevideo, Uruguay) was a Brazilian-Uruguayan composer, violinist, violist, viola d'amore player, and conductor of Ita birth.

== Life and music ==
Santórsola was born in Italy and his family settled in São Paulo, Brazil, in 1909. After receiving initial musical instruction from his father, Enrico, he soon entered the Conservatório Dramático e Musical de São Paulo studying violin with Zaccaria Autuori, and counterpoint, harmony and composition with Agostino Cantù and Lamberto Baldi.

He went to Europe to study violin with Gaetano Fusella (1876–1973) in Naples and Alfred Mistowski (1872–1964) at Trinity College, London.

Returning to Brazil in 1925, he founded the Brazilian Musical Institute, and was violist of the Paulista Quartet and the Rio de Janeiro Teatro Municipal Orchestra. Subsequently, he was professor of violin, viola and harmony at the Conservatório Dramático e Musical de São Paulo before settling in Montevideo in 1931. Italian maestro Lamberto Baldi, director of the Orquesta Sinfónica del SODRE, invited Santórsola to be first violist of his orchestra and also perform with the SODRE Chamber Ensemble. Santórsola later founded and conducted the orchestras of the Sociedad de Cultura Artística Uruguaya and the Instituto Cultural Brasil-Uruguay, was violist in the Kleiber Quartet, and was professor at the Instituto de Estudios Superiores of the Escuela Normal de Música of Montevideo.

Santórsola composed a large body of work that distinctly exhibits melodic and rhythmic energy of Latin America. His musical style was initially influenced by his interest in Baroque counterpoint, Brazilian and Uruguayan folk music, and later twelve-tone serialism. He wrote orchestral and vocal works, concertos, chamber and instrumental music, notably his numerous compositions for classical guitar.

Santórsola's pupils included the composer Amelia Repetto.

== Selected works ==
Publishers: Columbia Music, Southern Music Publishing, Bèrben Edizioni Musicali, Edizioni G. Zanibon, Peer Music, Editora Novas Metas, Ediciones Musicales Yolotl, Ricordi Americana (Buenos Aires), Ricordi Brasileira, Musicália (São Paulo)

=== Stage ===
- Parábola del ciego, Poema sinfónico coral y coreográfico (1935)
- El juicio final, Obra teatral, coreográfica, coral y sinfónica (1960–1961); words by Edgardo Ubaldo Genta

=== Orchestral ===
- Canção (Canción brasileña) (1930)
- Saudade (1931)
- Preludio No. 1 for string orchestra (1936)
- Preludios: 5 Pequeños poemas psíquicos for string orchestra (1936); also for piano
- Prelúdio No. 3 for chamber orchestra
- Preludio y fuga a la manera clásica for double string orchestra (1937); also for 2 violas and double bass
- Adagio y Allegro, 2 Symphonic Movements (1941)
- Preludio y fuga (after Bach) for string orchestra (1948)
- Vida de Artigas: Tres pequeños movimientos sinfónicos (1951)
- 2 Estudios (1953)
- Sinfonía No. 1 (1957); arrangement of String Quartet (Quartet No. 1)
- Rapsodia criolla (1960)
- Concerto No. 1 for orchestra (1964)
- 4 Piezas latinoamericanas (1971, orchestrated 1991); original for guitar(s)
- Tres cuadros sinfónicos, Poema coreográfico (1972)
- Concerto No. 2 Contrastes sonoros for orchestra (1981–1982)
- Sinfonía A (1990)
- Sinfonía B (1990)

=== Concertante ===
- Concerto for viola and orchestra with mixed chorus and viola d'amore (1932–1933)
- Canção triste e dança brasileira for viola and orchestra (1934); also for piano solo
- 3 Estados psicológicos for violin or viola and orchestra (1936)
- Sonata-fantasía for viola (or violin, or cello) and orchestra (1938)
- Concerto for piano and orchestra (1938–1939)
- Concertino for guitar and orchestra (1942)
- Concerto for bassoon and orchestra (1959)
- Concerto for violin and orchestra (1962)
- Concerto for 2 guitars and chamber orchestra (1966)
- Concerto for 4 horns and orchestra (1967)
- Concerto for 4 violins and string orchestra (1969)
- Concerto for 4 guitars and chamber orchestra (1972)
- Double Concerto for guitar, harpsichord and chamber orchestra (1973) or for guitar, harpsichord and chamber ensemble (1986)
- Concerto for 2 bandoneons (or bandoneon and piano), string orchestra and percussion (1976)
- Chôro No. 2 for violin and orchestra (1952, 1976); original for violin or viola and piano
- Concerto No. 2 for guitar and orchestra (1977)
- Concerto No. 3 for guitar and chamber orchestra (1983)
- 2 Imágenes sonoras for viola d'amore, string orchestra and celesta (1988); also for guitar and piano

=== Chamber music ===
- 10 Capricci for violin and piano (1920)
- Romanza for violin and piano (1926)
- Imperio burlesco for violin and piano
- Sonata in D minor for violin or viola and piano (1928)
- Saudade a minha mãe in B major for violin and piano (1931)
- Cancão triste e dança brasileira for viola and piano (1934); also orchestrated; also for piano solo
- Preludio y fuga a la manera clásica for 2 violas and double bass (1937); also for double string orchestra
- Suite: 3 Piecitas para el uso del primer dedo y cuerdas al aire for violin and piano (1941)
- Concertino en Re for violin and piano (1942)
- Concertino No. 2 "a la manera clásica" in G major for 3 violins and piano (1943)
- Chôro No. 1 in G major for viola (or violin) and piano (1944)
- Quintet for 4 flutes and piano, or for 2 violins, viola, cello and piano (1945)
- Chôro No. 2 in G major for violin or viola and piano (1952); also orchestrated (1976)
- Mangangá, Study for viola solo (1953)
- Introducción, tema y variaciones for flute, oboe, clarinet, horn and bassoon (1956); also for piano
- String Quartet (Quartet No. 1) (1957); orchestrated as Sinfonía No. 1 for string orchestra
- Quartet No. 2 for flute, viola, cello and guitar (1961)
- Trio for flute (or violin), clarinet and guitar (1964)
- Concierto a diez for flute, oboe, clarinet, bass clarinet, bassoon, horn, guitar, violin, viola, and cello (1966)
- Quintet for flute, oboe, clarinet, horn and bassoon (1966)
- Trio for flute, viola and piano (1969)
- Díptico for viola (or violin) and guitar (1970)
- Sugerencias sonoras for 3 woodwinds (flute, clarinet, bassoon), or 3 brass instruments (trumpet, horn, trombone), or stringed instruments (violin, viola, cello) and 2 guitars (or piano) (1970)
- Sonata a dúo No. 3 for guitar and piano (1971)
- Sonata a dúo No. 4 for flute and guitar (1975)
- Sonata a dúo No. 5 for flute (piccolo, bass flute) and guitar (1976)
- Concertino No. 2 for 3 guitars and harpsichord or piano (1978)
- Concerto a cinque for guitar and string quartet (1978)
- Microkosmos sonoro: 6 Bagatelas for oboe and guitar (1980)
- Sonata a dúo No. 6 for mandoline and guitar (1981)
- Sonata a dúo No. 7 Impressioni nostalgiche di Tavoleto for bandoneon and piano (1985)
- 2 Imágenes sonoras for guitar and piano (1988); original for viola d'amore, string orchestra and celesta
- Ensueño for guitar and piano

=== Guitar ===
- Serie argentina (1929)
- Prelúdio (1932)
- Chôro No. 1 for guitar (1944)
- Sonata en dos movimientos (1944)
- Vals romántico (1944)
- Suíte Antiga (Suite à Antiga; Suite a la antigua; Suite all'antica; Suite in the Ancient Style) (1945)

1. Prelúdio
2. Minueto
3. Musetta
4. Sarabanda
5. Giga

- Prelúdio No. 2 (1959)
- 5 Preludios (1959)
- Valsa-chôro (1960)
- Sonata a dúo No. 1 for 2 guitars (1962)
- Tríptico: Tres invenciones for 2 guitars (1965)
- 3 Aires de corte (3 Airs of Court) (1966)
- Sonata [No. 1] (1969)
- Sonata a dúo No. 2 for 2 guitars (1969)
- 4 Tientos (1970)
- 4 Piezas latinoamericanas for guitar solo (1971) or for 4 guitars (1972); also orchestrated

1. Chôro
2. Valsa chorosa
3. Vidalita
4. Malambo

- Sonata No. 2 Hispánica (1971)
- 7 Balbuceos sonoros o pequeños estudios (1973)
- 8 Pequeñas estudios (1973)
- 7 Estudios preparatorios (1973)
- 6 Bagatelas (1975)
- Microkosmos sonoro (1975)
- Sonata No. 3 (1975)
- Suite all'antica for 2 guitars (1975)
- 6 Estudios: Miniaturas (1977)
- Sonata No. 4 Italiana (1977)
- 3 Capricci (3 Caprichos) (1978)
- Concertino No. 1 "a la manera clásica" for 3 guitars (1978)
- Prelúdio (1978)
- Ringraziamento e Tempo di minuetto (1978)
- 2 Fisionomías sonoras (1979)
- 2 Momentos anímicos (1979)
- Nocturno (1979)
- Díptico (1980)
- Espejismo (1980)
- 2 Momentos musicales, Díptico for 2 guitars (1981)
- 2 Obras for 2 guitars (1981)
- 4 Pequeñas piezas (1981)
- Sonata No. 5 Brasileira (1981)
- Preludiando (1986)
- 4 Pequeñas piezas al estilo clásico for 2 guitars (1988)
- Estudio sobre doce sonidos
- Preludio, aria y finale (last composition)

=== Piano ===
- Improvisso burlesco (1929)
- Canção triste e dança brasileira (1934)
- Preludios: 5 Pequeños poemas psíguicos (1936); also for string orchestra
- 2 Invenciones (1938)
- Sonata No. 1 (1938–1939)
- Sonata infantil (1942)
- Chôro No. 1 in G major (1944)
- Pequeña suite: Dinorah y Beatriz (A la niña Dinorah Varsi) (1944)
- Prelúdio No. 1 de la Suíte Antiga (1945); original for guitar solo
- Introducción, tema y variaciones (1956); also for wind quintet
- Canción de cuna (Lullaby) (1958)
- Sonatina in G major (1958)
- Tema y variaciones sobre el "Arrorró mi niño" (1960)
- Sueños de una muñeca (1961)
- Valsa chorosa (1971); arrangement from 4 Piezas latinoamericanas for guitar
- Vidalita (1971); arrangement from 4 Piezas latinoamericanas for guitar
- Estrellas en Lejanía (1974)
- Sonata No. 2 (1980)
- Imágenes de un sueño (1984)

=== Vocal ===
- 8 Canciones for voice and orchestra or piano (1930–1935)

1. Aspirar; words by Alvaro Moreira
2. Passos perdidos na sombra; words by Eliezer Dêmenezes
3. Duérmete pequeño; words by Carolina Olave Barbot
4. Desear no es querer; words by Carlos Bernardo González Pecotche
5. Quien de vosotros quiere llegar a ser; words by Carlos Bernardo González Pecotche
6. Vivir la vida porque sí; words by Carlos Bernardo González Pecotche
7. La mentira es villana; words by Carlos Bernardo González Pecotche
8. Obediencia; words by Rosalía Pubill

- Vida garfio for voice and piano (1930); words by Juana de Ibarbourou
- 5 Imágenes musicales: Inspiradas en Enseñanzas del Maestro Raumsol for voice and orchestra (or piano) (1934–1935); words by Rosalía Pubill

1. Desear no es querer
2. Quien de vosotros quiere llegar a ser
3. Vivir la vida porque sí
4. La mentira es villana
5. Obediencia

- Agonía for alto and orchestra (1937); words by Juan Cunha Dotti
- 2 Rondas para niños for voice and piano (1937); words by Enriqueta Troutbeck
- 8 Obras for voice and orchestra (1964)
- Os três mistérios da noite: Tríptico sinfónico vocal con locutor (The Three Mysteries of Night: Vocal-Symphonic Triptych) for narrator, alto and orchestra (1966); words by Hermínio Bello de Carvalho
- 5 Canciones for voice and guitar (1981); words by Jesús Silva

=== Choral ===
- 2 Madrigales (1928)
- Vida de Artigas (1951)
- Semblanza de Artigas (Portrait of Artigas), Poema sinfónico-coral for narrator, mixed chorus and orchestra (1952); words by Bartolomé Hidalgo
- Canto del departamento de Artigas (1953)
- Canto del departamento de Lavalleja (1953)
- Canto a Canelones (1957)
- Canto a Treinta y Tres (1957)
- Concerto for Chorus Without Words for mixed chorus and viola d'amore
- Cantata a Artigas, for narrator, mixed chorus and orchestra (1965)

=== Transcriptions ===
- Sonata de Ariosti for viola and chamber orchestra (1934); Sonata II by Attilio Ariosti transcribed for viola and chamber orchestra

=== Literary ===
- Primer libro de armonía: Bajos realizados pro el autor (1928)
- Libro de armonía y contrapunto (tradicional, moderno) or Segundo libro de armonía (Contrapunto y armonía moderna), Montevideo (1932)
- Lenguaje musical: Aspectos teóricos y prácticos de la Música (1932)
- Lineamientos de la fuga (1941)
- Análisis psicológico del sonido musical, Montevideo (1942)
- El uso inteligente del pedal; O uso inteligente do pedal, São Paulo, Ricordi Brasileira (1966)
- Los principios armónicos de los sonidos atractivos y atraídos a la guitarra, Montevideo (1970–1971)
