= Genevieve Oswald =

American dance scholar and archivist (1921–2019)

- Born: Genevieve Mary Oswald; August 24, 1921; Buffalo, New York
- Died: March 19, 2019; Santa Clarita, California
- Occupation(s): librarian, dance historian
- Years active: 1944-1987
- Known for: founder, first curator of the New York Public Library's dance collection, from 1947 to 1987

Genevieve Mary Oswald (August 24, 1921 – March 19, 2019) was an American dance scholar and archivist, founder and curator of the New York Public Library's dance archive.

== Early life ==
Oswald was born in Buffalo, New York, the daughter of Charles Oswald and Jeannette Glenn Oswald. Her father worked at a shipping company. She earned a bachelor's degree in music at the North Carolina College for Women in 1943.

== Career ==
Oswald moved to New York to pursue a career as a singer. She began working at the New York Public Library in 1944, in the Music Division. In 1947, she founded and became curator of the library's new Dance Collection. In 1954, she wrote, "It is important that the public be able to get dance information, because the dance art can be considerably strengthened and more firmly established if its public is well-informed." She expanded the specialized holdings to include films and materials related to Asian dance traditions, and built the collection of dance films. She also collected oral histories. In 1965, she oversaw the collection's move to a new location at Lincoln Center. In 1978 she traveled to China to meet with Chinese dance scholars and give lectures on American modern dance. She retired in 1987, taking the title "Curator Emerita of the Dance Collection". The Jerome Robbins Dance Division of the New York Public Library remains "one of the world's most renowned centers for dance research".

Oswald won the Capezio Award in 1956, for her contributions to dance scholarship; the award was presented to her at a luncheon, with remarks by Carl Van Vechten. In 1965 Oswald was one of the twelve founding members of the Congress on Research in Dance (CoRD). From 1970 to 1974, she taught courses in the history of dance, at New York University. She was also coordinator of the Americas Center of the World Dance Alliance. In 1978, she was presented with an honorary Doctor of Fine Arts degree from her alma mater, the University of North Carolina at Greensboro.

== Personal life ==
Genevieve Oswald married musician and music educator Dean Leslie Johnson in 1949. They had a son and a daughter. She was widowed when Johnson died in 1981. She died in 2019, aged 97 years, in Santa Clarita, California.
