= Logosophy =

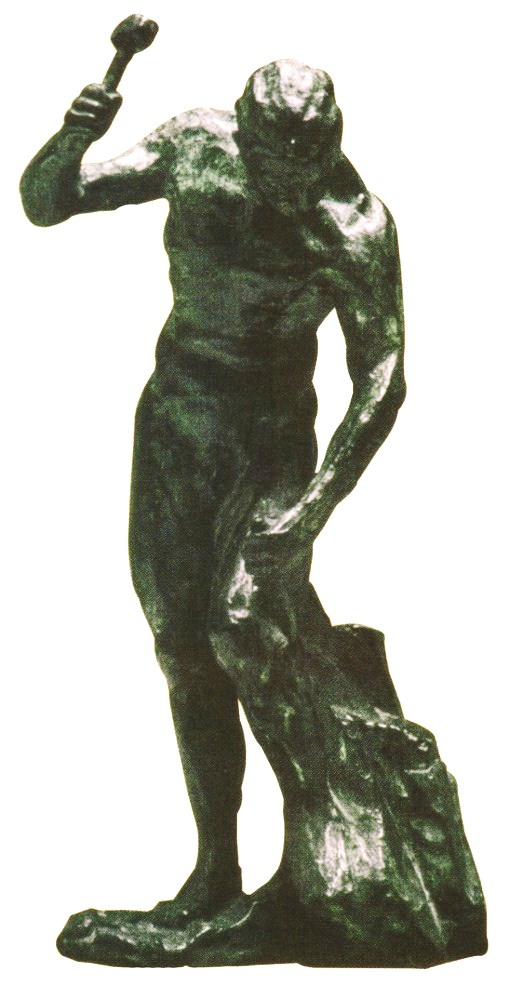
Man sculpting himself by Uruguayan artist Yandí Luzardo, inspired in the objective of Logosophy: conscious evolution of mankind

Logosophy is an ethical-philosophical doctrine developed by the Argentine humanist and thinker Carlos Bernardo González Pecotche, which offers teachings of conceptual order and practices that lead oneself to self-cognition and self-improvement through a process of conscious evolution.

Logosophy argues that the thoughts can be autonomous and independent of one's individual will, and that they are born and fulfill their function under the influence of the moral or psychic states of their owner or someone else. Its purpose is to free the mental faculties of suggestive influences, allowing the human being to think freely and understand the true objectives of life.

Logosophy presents itself as a new and conclusive science, which reveals a method and a set of disciplines of its own, with the purpose of leading man to the knowledge of his own self, of the Universe, and its eternal laws. It also presents itself as a new way of feeling and conceiving life, since it presents a new conception of humanity, human psychic and mental organization, and the human life in its broadest possibilities and proportions.

Its name is the combination of the Greek word "logos" and "sophia", which the author has adopted as meaning Creative Word or Manifestation of the Supreme Knowledge, and Original Science or Wisdom, respectively, to denote "a new line of cognitions, a doctrine, a method and a technique which are eminently its own".

Logosophy was created in 1930, with the creation of the first Logosophical Foundation in the city of Córdoba, Argentina.

== The author ==
Carlos Bernardo González Pecotche, also known as Raumsol, was born on August 11, 1901, in Buenos Aires, Argentina. He was a son of Jorge N. González and Maria Pecotche de González. He married Paulina Eugenia Puntel on October 8, 1924, and had a son, Carlos Federico González Puntel, born on July 10, 1925. He died in Buenos Aires on April 4, 1963.

== The method ==
The logosophical method, as its author claims, is unique in its essence and has the quality of adapting itself to each and every mind, giving it the share of knowledge that it is capable of absorbing.

The examination of the aptitudes and the conditions of assimilation are factors to which the method gives special consideration. Its main artery, which makes the teaching live and breathe in the soul of the student, is the one which requires him, as the main function of the cognition which it bestows, to become intimately familiarized with the teaching to the point of identifying himself with it by associating it to his life.

The logosophical method intends to guide the human being to a more thorough knowledge of his mind considered in the entirety of its complex operation. Logosophy invites man to carry out a complete study of his own psychology – his character, his tendencies, his thoughts, his qualities, his deficiencies, and whatever relates directly or indirectly to the movements of his mental faculties and contemplates his spiritual state.

== Objectives ==
The main objectives of the logosophical cognitions are:

- Man's conscious evolution, achieved through the organization of his mental, sensitive and instinctive systems.
- The knowledge of one's self, which implies full mastery of the elements which constitute the secret of each individual's existence.
- The integration of one's spirit, so that the individual may put to use the values that are his own, for they have their origin in his self inheritance.
- The knowledge of the universal laws, which is indispensable for the human being to adjust his life to their wise principles.
- The knowledge of the mental, transcendent or metaphysical world, where all the ideas and thoughts that fecund human life originate.
- The creation of a new life and a better destiny, by surpassing to a maximum one's ordinary prerogatives.
- The development and mastery of the functions of studying, learning, teaching, thinking and accomplishing, all of which are transubstantiated through the Logosophical method into individual aptitudes of an invaluable significance for the future of the education of mankind.

== Logosophy and philosophy ==
According to González Pecotche, the logosophical knowledge does not have common points of reference with any of the usually studied branches of knowledge, be it Science, Philosophy, Psychology, etc.

Regarding the relationship between Logosophy and Philosophy, González Pecotche stated:

"In this regard, Logosophy includes two powerful forces which, when they unite and bond, lead man to accomplish the two aims of this existence: to evolve toward perfection and to constitute himself as a real contributor to humanity. One of these factors is the cognition that it offers to the human mind; the other is the affection that teaches how to fulfill human hearts. The common science lacks this affection, this force; it is cold and rigid, and sometimes speculative and intemperate, as in the case of philosophy; conversely, Logosophy is conciliatory. Herein lies the great difference and which also explains why it is capable of realizing great accomplishments in the human soul and which seem inconceivable to those who remain extraneous to such possibilities."

== Logosophy as Humanism ==
Amongst the multiple views that González Pecotche provides of Logosophy, he also mentions that it is a new kind of Humanism. However he differentiates his original contributions from the works of other Humanists:

"Differing therefore from the generalized concept of humanism, our humanism starts from one's own sensitive and thinking being who seeks to accomplish within himself the evolutionary process that all humanity must follow. One's accomplishment in this respect will inevitably constitute later a true example of what each participant within the great human family can achieve."

== Logosophical institutions ==
Currently, there are logosophical institutions on the following countries:

- Argentina
- Brazil
- Israel
- Mexico
- Spain
- Venezuela
- United States
- Uruguay

According to logosophy.info, there are also students and centers of study in formation in countries including Australia, Canada, France, Germany, Italy, and the United Kingdom.
