= Repetto =

French ballet shoe company

- Industry: Ballet Shoe Manufacturer
- Founded: 1947; 78 years ago
- Founder: Rose Repetto
- Headquarters: France
- Website: repetto.com

Repetto is a French ballet shoe company founded in 1947 by Rose Repetto, after her son, choreographer Roland Petit, would come home from classes complaining of sore feet. Repetto provides ballet shoes for the Opéra National de Paris and many other well-known French ballet companies. As of 2013, the company had 60 million euros in revenues and employed 340 people.

== History ==
Rose Repetto created her first ballet shoes for her son in 1947 and soon thereafter opened up her first workshop near the National Opera of Paris. The company gained fame from creating the "Cendrillon" ballerina flat for French ballet dancer and actress Brigitte Bardot's 1956 film Et Dieu… créa la femme. In 1959, Repetto opened up a store at 22 rue de la Paix in Paris near the National Opera that remains open to this day.

The brand fell out of the limelight after Repetto's death in 1984, but French entrepreneur Jean-Marc Gaucher helped turn around the company when he took over as CEO in 1999. Since then, Repetto has expanded internationally and tried to define itself as a luxury lifestyle brand. It has branched out into a footwear collection for women, men and children, ready-to-wear, small leather goods and fragrances. The company opened its first store in America in the New York City neighborhood of SoHo in the fall of 2015. The location permanently shut down in 2020 due to the COVID-19 pandemic.

Repetto continues to launch new designs and in March 2024, it unveiled its Spring Summer Collection, which includes its iconic Cendrillon ballet flats as well as the new Camille Mules.
