= Amelia Repetto =

Uruguayan composer

Amelia Repetto, sometimes Amelia Repetto Espinosa, is a Uruguayan composer.

Repetto studied piano with Julieta Bizzozero and took lessons in harmony, counterpoint, and orchestration under Guido Santórsola. As a composer she has written for chamber forces, and has composed choral music, piano music, and songs as well. She has also been active as a teacher of music appreciation in high schools and an instructor at the elementary level.
