= Salvatore Capezio =

Italian-born shoemaker

Salvatore Capezio (1871–1940) was an Italian-born shoemaker who established Capezio, one of the world's largest manufacturers of dance apparel and specialized dance shoes, including ballet pointe shoes. He was born in Muro Lucano, Italy.

== Legacy ==
Several scholarships and awards for dancers have been established in Salvatore Capezio's name.
