= Rose Repetto =

Italian business owner (1907 – 1982)

- Born: 10 August 1907; Milan, Italy
- Died: 11 March 1982 (aged 74); Paris, France
- Occupation: businesswoman

Rose Repetto (10 August 1907 – 11 March 1982) was an Italian-born French business owner and shoe designer. In 1947, she established the Repetto ballet shoe company.

== Life and work ==
Repetto was born around 1907 in Milan. In the early 1920s, she moved to Paris where she met and dated restaurant owner Edmond Petit. In 1924, their son, future dancer and choreographer Roland Petit was born. In 1947, Repetto started designing ballet shoes after her son would come home from classes complaining of sore feet. She developed ballet flats for Brigitte Bardot in 1956 for the film And God Created Woman. They were known as "Cendrillon", from the French version of Cinderella, and became popular as fashion shoes as well. In 1959, she opened a boutique in 22 rue de la Paix in Paris. Her customers included Maurice Béjart, Rudolf Nureyev, Mikhail Baryshnikov, Carolyn Carlson, the Kirov Ballet and the Folies Bergère.

Repetto died in Paris in 1982. Her son subsequently sold the company bearing her name.
