= Fall for Dance Festival =

Annual dance festival in New York City

Fall for Dance is an annual dance festival presented by New York City Center in New York City. Established in 2004 as a means to introduce new audiences to dance, and loosely based on the Delacorte Dance Festival model of the 1960s and 1970s, Fall For Dance showcases as many as five different dance companies on each of the festival's six nights. In response to the Festival's popularity, in 2006 the number of performances was expanded to ten, with four of the six programs being repeated; in 2009 the number of performances remained ten, with five programs, each repeating.
