= Carlos Bernardo González Pecotche =

Argentine humanist and thinker

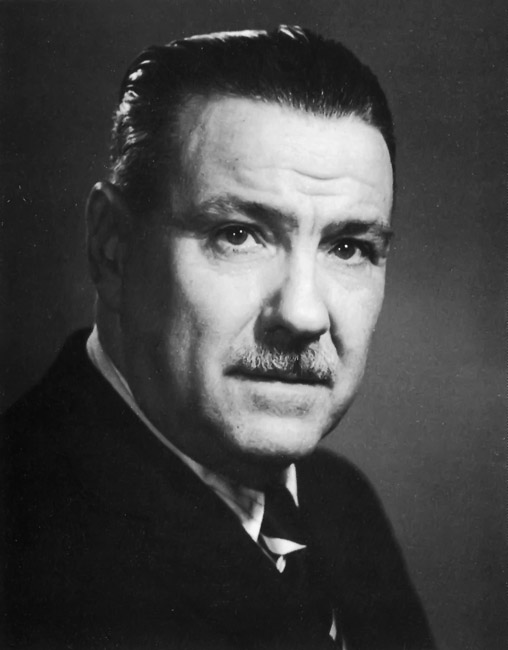
- Born: August 11, 1901; Buenos Aires, Argentina
- Died: April 4, 1963 (aged 61); Buenos Aires, Argentina
- Occupations: Writer, humanist and thinker
- Spouse: Paulina Eugenia Puntel (1924-1963)
- Children: Carlos Federico González Puntel
- Writing career
- Pen name: Raumsol
- Language: Spanish

Carlos Bernardo González Pecotche (August 11, 1901 – April 4, 1963), also known as Raumsol, was an Argentine humanist and thinker. He created and developed logosophy in 1930.

== Biography ==
González Pecotche was a son of Jorge N. González and Maria Pecotche de González. He married Paulina Eugenia Puntel on October 8, 1924, and had a son, Carlos Federico González Puntel, born on July 10, 1925.

He founded the first Logosophical Cultural Center on August 11, 1930, in the city of Córdoba, Argentina. Afterwards he implemented the creation of many other logosophical centers of study in Argentina, Uruguay and Brazil. He was the editor of two magazines (Aquarius, 1931–1939, and Logosofía, 1941–1947) and a newspaper (El Heraldo Raumsólico, 1935–1938), committed in teaching and divulging logosophical knowledge. He gave more than a thousand conferences and classes in Argentina, Uruguay and Brazil maintaining, during his life, extensive and comprehensive contact with scholars of Logosophy all over the world, as well as with intellectuals in South America and Europe. He wrote several books concerning Logosophy in several genres.

He also created the Logosophical Educational System, which today has seven schools in Brazil, two in Argentina and one in Uruguay. These schools apply the logosophical pedagogy.

== Bibliography ==
- An Introduction to the Logosophical Cognition - 1951
- Bases for Your Conduct (posthumous) - 1965
- Deficiencies and Propensities of the Human Being - 1962
- Dialogue - 1952 (Diálogos in Spanish; not yet available in English)
- Initiation Course into Logosophy - 1963
- Logosophical Exegesis - 1956
- Logosophical Interlude - 1950 (Intermedio Logosófico in Spanish; not yet available in English)
- Logosophy, Science and Method - 1957
- Mr. De Sándara - 1959 (El Señor De Sándara in Spanish; not yet available in English)
- Self-inheritance - 1957
- The Spirit (posthumous) - 1968
- The Mechanism of Conscious Life - 1956

== Acknowledgments ==
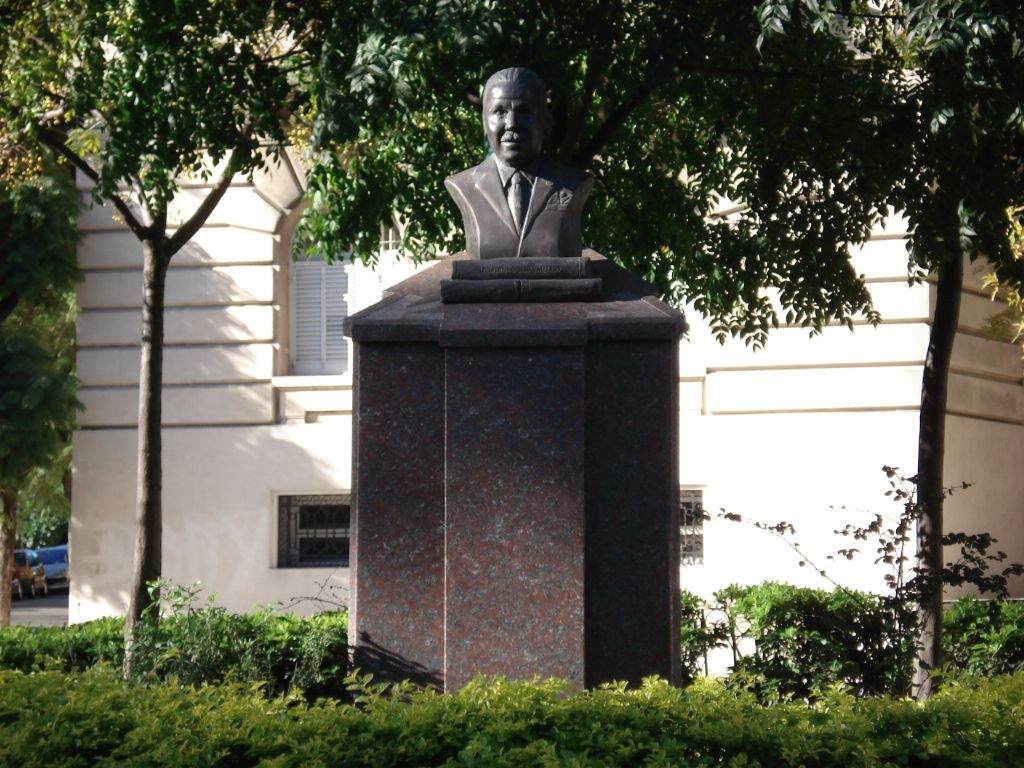
Pecotche's bust

The city of Buenos Aires (Argentina) has paid him an homage with a plate on the Portugal Plaza and with a Plaza that takes his name, near the National Library.
