= National Dance Week =

Annual dance event in the United States

National Dance Week (NDW) is an annual event in the United States sponsored by the United Dance Merchants of America to increase public awareness and appreciation of various forms of dance. The event is coordinated by an organization under the same name headquartered in Pittsburgh, Pennsylvania, which operates under the sponsorship of the UDMA and currently seeks for the 501(c)(3) nonprofit organization status

The Coalition for National Dance Week was formed in 1981 by a group of dance related organizations to bring greater recognition to dance as an art form. Since 1991 the NDW is sponsored by the UDMA.

NDW volunteers host more than a thousand events nationwide during the observation.

== National Dance Week 2009 ==
Dance Week 2009 was from April 24-May 3, 2009.

== National Dance Week 2007 ==
National Dance Week 2007 was from April 20 through the 29th. Activities scheduled for 2007 included community dance performances, free classes, an essay contest, and an attempt to break the Guinness World Record for the "Largest Ballet Class a la barre" sponsored by the Oregon Ballet Foundation.

== See also ==
- International Dance Day – April 29
- National Dance Day – last Saturday in July
