= Mary Watkins Cushing =

American dance and music critic (1889–1974)

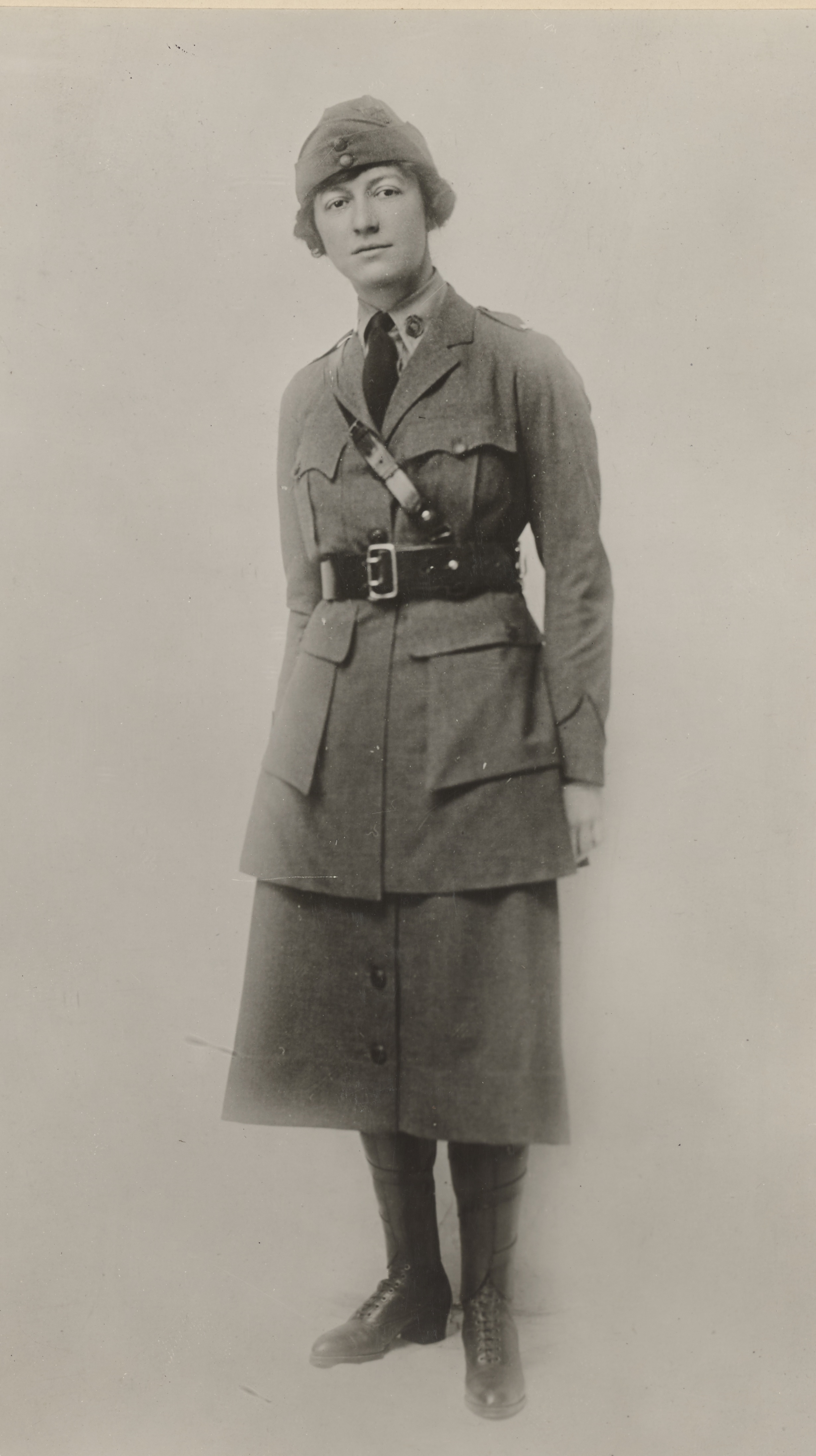
- Cushing in 1918
- Born: Mary Fitch Watkins; January 11, 1889; New Haven, Connecticut, U.S.
- Died: October 4, 1974 (aged 85); Manhattan, New York City, U.S.
- Resting place: Lakeview Cemetery, New Canaan, Connecticut
- Occupations: Dance and music critic
- Children: Antonia Stone
- Writing career
- Subjects: Modern dance; opera
- Notable works: "Stolen Thunder" (1930); The Rainbow Bridge (1954)

Mary Watkins Cushing (born Mary Fitch Watkins; January 11, 1889 – October 4, 1974) was an American music and dance critic, covering the fields of opera and modern dance. Cushing maintained a close relationship with opera star Olive Fremstad (1871–1951), serving as her live-in secretary and "buffer" for seven years.

Cushing was one of the first full-time newspaper dance critics in the United States, writing for the New York Herald Tribune from 1927 to 1934. Following her departure from the Herald Tribune, Cushing wrote about opera and dance on a freelance basis. Her 1930 short story "Stolen Thunder" was adapted into the film Oh, For a Man!, and later in life she wrote a biography of Fremstad, The Rainbow Bridge.

== Biography ==
Mary Fitch Watkins was born on January 11, 1889 in New Haven, Connecticut, the daughter of Helen Randolph Smith and Episcopal pastor Schureman Halsted Watkins. During Watkins' childhood, her father held positions at churches in Meriden, Connecticut; New Haven; northern Vermont; and New York City. Watkins developed an interest in opera during her childhood, which included her love for her childhood collection of Red Seal opera recordings. This developed into "an obsession" for the live performance of opera during her studies at the Art Students League of New York.

In 1911, while studying at the League, Watkins began a correspondence with opera star Olive Fremstad. Watkins sent Fremstad a portrait that she drew of the singer as Brünnhilde in Die Walküre, which captured Fremstad's attention. Fremstad and Watkins first met that April, and the two began a close relationship that developed into Watkins serving as Fremstad's live-in personal secretary, or "buffer" as Watkins herself described.

In Watkins' seven years with Fremstad, she served as Fremstad's representative, personal assistant, and confidante, accompanying her on tours across North America and Europe. With the United States' entry into World War I in 1917, public perception of German-language opera changed, affecting Fremstad's career. Watkins joined the war effort in 1918, sailing for France to serve as a truck driver. In Watkins' words, "exactly seven years to the very day and hour since I had walked down a corridor in the Ansonia Hotel and into Olive Fremstad's service, I walked out of it up a gangplank and sailed away to war."

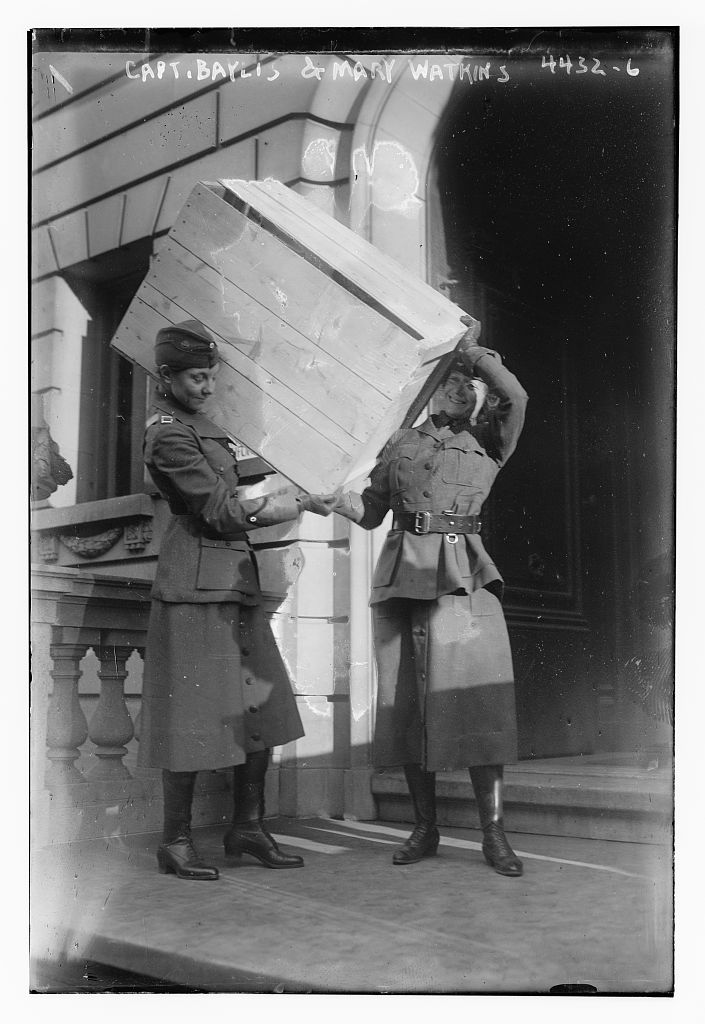
Watkins (right) with National League for Women's Service Motor Corps Capt. Adelaide Brooks Baylis in New York, ca. early 1918

Watkins initially served as a truck and ambulance driver with the Motor Corps of the National League for Women's Service, and later the American Fund for French Wounded. Watkins recounted her experience in France in a 1921 letter to the editor published in The New York Times, where she supported Owen Wister's argument that American soldiers who died in combat in France should be buried in France. During her service, Watkins met philanthropist Anne Morgan, and wrote a biography of her for The Woman Citizen in 1927.

After her service in France, Watkins returned to the field of opera criticism. She wrote two books on the subject of opera: First Aid to the Opera-Goer (1924) and Behind The Scenes at the Opera (1925). She joined the staff of the New York Herald Tribune in 1926 as an assistant music critic. In late summer of that year, she married Edward T.F. Cushing, music critic for The Brooklyn Daily Eagle.

In addition to opera criticism, Mary Watkins Cushing entered the rapidly-expanding field of modern dance. She was appointed the chief dance critic for the Herald Tribune in the fall of 1927, continuing to write as Mary Fitch Watkins. Watkins was the inaugural dance critic for the Herald Tribune, which created the position after a successful run of performances by the Denishawn company at Carnegie Hall in the spring of 1927. As one of the first full-time modern dance critics in the United States, she was a peer of John Martin of The New York Times and Lucile Marsh of the New York World, who were both appointed that fall.

Watkins had no background in dance when she was appointed as the Herald Tribune's dance critic, unlike her contemporaries. In an interview later in life, she recounted that her only prior knowledge of dance was Fremstad's account of how divas fell on stage. Despite this, historian Lynne Conner argues that Watkins was well-prepared for the assignment, as a knowledgeable critic and writer who was willing to consider dance seriously.

Conner argues that Watkins maintained a mutually beneficial relationship with the artists that she covered, as did her peer critics. Conner highlights the founding and evolution of the Dance Repertory Theatre (a cooperative company featuring the Helen Tamiris, Humphrey-Weidman, and Martha Graham companies) as an example of this cooperation, which she argues resulted from Cushing's advocacy in her columns from January 1930 onwards.

In addition to her criticism, Watkins also wrote short stories. Her 1930 short story "Stolen Thunder," published in The Saturday Evening Post, was adapted into the musical comedy film Oh, For a Man! that year. The film stars Jeanette MacDonald as an opera singer, opposite Reginald Denny as a burglar who unwittingly breaks into the home of his idol.

Her daughter Antonia was born in the early 1930s, and Watkins left the Herald Tribune in 1934. Conner argues that 1934 was a "watershed moment" in the history of modern dance and its criticism, marked by a resurgence in American ballet and the creation of a formal structure to describe modern dance. The position of dance critic at the Herald Tribune went unfilled until 1939.

Mary Watkins Cushing remained friends with Olive Fremstad, whose career effectively ended in 1919. Fremstad died in 1951, and Cushing published a biography of her in 1954. The biography is titled The Rainbow Bridge, after the mythical rainbow bridge that appears in the final scene of Richard Wagner's opera Das Rheingold, the finale of the four-part Ring cycle. The Rainbow Bridge was described by literary theorist Jonathan Goldberg as "the only full-scale biography of Fremstad."

Cushing lived in New Canaan, Connecticut during her later life. She wrote a history of her house for the New Canaan Historical Society in 1949, and hosted her daughter Antonia's wedding in the home in 1955. Edward Cushing died in 1956.

Mary Watkins Cushing lived on the Upper East Side of New York near the end of her life. She died in New York on October 4, 1974, and is buried in Lakeview Cemetery in New Canaan.

== Critical perspectives ==
In a 1987 retrospective, contemporary dance critic Jennifer Dunning described Cushing's critical style as "glow[ing] with intelligence, tart wit and evocative observation that draws upon but is not a nervous slave to her knowledge of music and the other arts".

At the start of her work in dance criticism, Cushing was critical of the radical nature of modern dance, an opinion that changed over time. Conner argues that Cushing's acceptance of radicalism is shown by Cushing's reviews of Helen Tamiris, which evolved from negative to positive from 1927 to 1931. Cushing's perspective on Tamiris was initially in contrast to her peers Marsh and Martin, whose reviews of Tamiris' debut concert in October 1927 were positive. According to Conner, Cushing's response to Tamiris' debut concert in October 1927 was sarcastic and dismissive, but by 1931 Cushing had warmed to Tamiris' experimental style.

Cushing also evolved away from a perspective that dance was an art form wholly reilant upon music. Lesley Main, a contemporary scholar of the works of Doris Humphrey, highlighted Cushing's positive reviews of Humphrey's 1928 concert piece Water Study, which is performed in silence to the rhythm of the dancers' breath.

== Legacy ==
Cushing's work for Fremstad covered the peak of Fremstad's professional career, and the two maintained a lifelong relationship until Fremstad's death in 1951. Fremstad's life and her relationships with women inspired multiple works of fiction, including Willa Cather's The Song of the Lark (1915) and Marcia Davenport's Of Lena Geyer (1936). Multiple scholars argue that the central relationship in Of Lena Geyer, between opera diva Lena Geyer and her fan Elsie deHaven, is a fictionalized and more sexualized version of Watkins and Fremstad's relationship.

Cushing's daughter Antonia Stone (ca. 1930–2002) was active in the field of technology education, and received the Norbert Wiener Award for Social and Professional Responsibility and the ACM Eugene L. Lawler Award for her work to reduce the digital divide in the United States.

== Publications ==
- Watkins, Mary Fitch (1924). First Aid To The Opera-Goer. New York: Frederick A. Stokes.
- Watkins, Mary Fitch (1925). Behind The Scenes At The Opera. New York: Frederick A. Stokes.
- Cushing, Mary Watkins (1949). "The St. John – Buttery – H. M. Lee House". Landmarks of New Canaan. New Canaan Historical Society (published 1951).
- Cushing, Mary Watkins (1954). The Rainbow Bridge. New York: G. P. Putnam's Sons.
