= Lena Groeger =

American journalist

- Born: Cambridge, Massachusetts, U.S.
- Citizenship: United States
- Education: Brown University (BA); New York University (MA)
- Occupations: Journalist, Designer, Developer
- Employer: ProPublica
- Known for: Visual Evidence
- Website: lenagroeger.com

Lena Groeger is an American investigative journalist, graphic designer and news application developer at ProPublica. She creates data visualizations and interactive databases on a variety of subjects, including education, politics and healthcare. She also writes about design's role in society in a series called Visual Evidence. In addition to her work at ProPublica, her science writing has appeared in Scientific American, Wired, Forbes, and Slate.

== Early life and education ==
Groeger was born in Cambridge, Massachusetts. She received a B.A. in Biology and Philosophy from Brown University in 2008, and later earned an M.A. from New York University in Science Journalism in 2011. Because of her interest in design, she also took classes at the Rhode Island School of Design during her undergraduate years. Prior to attending Brown, she went to Cambridge Rindge and Latin School in her hometown for high school.

Groeger ran cross-country throughout high school and college. She ranked the 31st at the USATF New England Cross Country Championships during the 2006-2007 season.

== Career ==
Groeger launched her career in science writing while pursuing her master's degree under New York University's reputable Science, Health & Environmental Reporting (SHERP) graduate program. Between 2011 and 2012, she consecutively interned for Wired magazine's digital edition and Scientific American. She authored multiple notable articles, including her 2011 Wired report on British Social Entrepreneur Ken Banks and his FrontlineSMS messaging software and her 2012 Scientific American piece on the high-IQ Triple Nine Society, which Scientific American republished in 2014 and then in 2015. At the same time, she also contributed to ScienceLine, a journal affiliated to her graduate program.

Groeger has occasionally produced science journals since she joined ProPublica in 2011. Her influential coverage on mechanically separated meat in 2012 appeared in Forbes and Slate magazine.

=== Data and graphics ===
The then-science writer turned her reporting focus to social trends, electoral politics, and foreign policy when she joined ProPublica for an internship, which also initiated her lasting ProPublica career that allows her to shift gears between a data journalist, a news app developer, and a designer. Groeger now lives in San Francisco and produces graphic-aided and data-oriented investigations on topics including immigration, elections, and drones. Utilizing her proficiency in data, her literacy in political and social issues, and her background in design, Groeger also authors Visual Evidence, an essay series that zooms in on the social implications of biased default settings involved in technological and civic designs. Her writings and visualizations have been cited in many major news outlets such as The Atlantic, The Washington Post, Slate magazine, and The New Yorker.

Groeger's data-related work, however, is not limited to data journalism. She is also credited with multiple projects that aggregate, update, analyze, and communicate large datasets from public sources in a way that guarantees the accessibility, readability, and timeliness of the data presented. The projects to which she has made development contributions vary in topics, but the recurring themes are business, elections, and health information: the New York State Subsidy Tracker and the "Tax Avoidance Has a Heartbeat" program tracks corporate behavior; the "Election DataBot" performs near-real-time scraps from sources including Google search trends, news articles, and press releases by and about Congress members; the "Treatment Tracker" and "Prescriber Checkup" allows users to access information on Medicare health providers by searching for providers, zip codes, or cities.

=== Teaching ===
Groeger has also taught courses on design and data visualization at City University of New York's Graduate School of Journalism, The New School, and New York University. She has also instructed a variety of workshops at the ProPublica Data Institute and has spoken at many data journalism and investigative journalism conferences around the world.

=== Other appointments ===
Groeger has served on the board of the Society for News Design since 2016.

=== Awards ===
Groeger co-authored the winning investigation of the 2015 Investigative Reporters and Editors (IRE) Medal and the 2016 Gerald Loeb Award for Explanatory business journalism, "Insult to Injury" by ProPublica, a project exposing the unsatisfactory level of worker compensation in the United States. She was also named finalist in the "Excellence in Local Reporting" category of the 2017 Livingston Awards for Young Journalists for her co-authorship the news application, "Tracking Evictions and Rent Stabilization in NYC" that Groeger and three of her colleagues at ProPublica produced in 2016. The Award commends exemplary achievements of journalists under the age of 35.
