= Computer Professionals for Social Responsibility =

Former global group that promoted responsible use of computer technology

- Abbreviation: CPSR
- Formation: 1983
- Dissolved: 2013
- Type: NGO
- Purpose: Promote responsible use of computer technology
- Headquarters: Seattle, Washington
- Website: cpsr.org

Computer Professionals for Social Responsibility (CPSR) was a global organization promoting the responsible use of computer technology. CPSR was incorporated in 1983 following discussions and organizing that began in 1981. It educated policymakers and the public on a wide range of issues. CPSR incubated numerous projects such as Privaterra, the Public Sphere Project, the Electronic Privacy Information Center, the 21st Century Project, the Civil Society Project, and the Computers, Freedom and Privacy Conference. Founded by U.S. computer scientists at Stanford University and Xerox PARC, CPSR had members in over 30 countries on six continents. CPSR was a non-profit 501.c.3 organization registered in California.

When CPSR was established, it was concerned solely about the use of computers in warfare. It was focused on the Strategic Computing Initiative, a US Defense project to use artificial intelligence in military systems, but added opposition to the Strategic Defense Initiative (SDI) shortly after the program was announced. The Boston chapter helped organize a debate related to the software reliability of SDI systems which drew national attention ("Software Seen as Obstacle in Developing 'Star Wars', Philip M. Boffey, (The New York Times, September 16, 1986) to these issues. Later, workplace issues, privacy, and community networks were added to CPSR's agenda.

CPSR began as a chapter-based organization and had chapters in Palo Alto, Boston, Seattle, Austin, Washington DC, Portland (Oregon) and other US locations as well as a variety of international chapters including Peru and Spain. The chapters often developed innovative projects including a slide show about the dangers of launch on warning (Boston chapter) and the Seattle Community Network (Seattle chapter).

CPSR sponsored two conferences: the Participatory Design Conferences which was held biennially and the Directions and Implications of Advanced Computing (DIAC) symposium series which was launched in 1987 in Seattle. The DIAC symposia have been convened roughly every other year since that time. Four books (Directions and Implications of Advanced Computing; Reinventing Technology, Rediscovering Community; Community Practice in the Network Society; Shaping the Network Society; "Liberating Voices: A Pattern Language for Communication Revolution") and two special sections in the Communications of the ACM ("Social Responsibility" and "Social Computing") resulted from the DIAC symposia.

There's a debate about holding computer professionals accountable for unforeseen negative consequences of their work. However, some believe that most computer-related disasters can be prevented through a deeper understanding of professional responsibility. The organization was dissolved in May 2013.

== Norbert Wiener Award ==
CPSR awarded the Norbert Wiener Award for Social and Professional Responsibility. Since CPSR's dissolution, the IEEE Society on Social Implications of Technology (SSIT) is now making the Norbert Weiner awards.

The awards as given during the existence of CPSR are as follows:

- 1987: David Parnas
- 1988: Joseph Weizenbaum
- 1989: Daniel McCracken
- 1990: Kristen Nygaard
- 1991: Severo Ornstein and Laura Gould
- 1992: Barbara Simons
- 1993: Institute for Global Communications
- 1994: Antonia Stone
- 1995: Tom Grundner
- 1996: Phil Zimmermann
- 1997: Peter Neumann
- 1998: Internet Engineering Task Force
- 1999: The Free Software & Open Source Movements
- 2000: Marc Rotenberg
- 2001: Nira Schwartz and Theodore Postol
- 2002: Karl Auerbach
- 2003: Mitch Kapor
- 2004: Barry Steinhardt
- 2005: Douglas Engelbart
- 2008: Bruce Schneier
- 2013: Gary Chapman (posthumous)
