= Gary Chapman =

Gary Chapman may refer to:

- Gary Chapman (author) (born 1938), author of the Five Love Languages series
- Gary Chapman (footballer, born 1964), English footballer
- Gary Chapman (musician) (born 1957), American singer/songwriter and former television talk show host
- Gary Chapman (swimmer) (1938–1978), Australian Olympic swimmer
- Gary Chapman (CPSR) (1952–2010), author, educator, activist and first executive director of Computer Professionals for Social Responsibility
- Gary Chapman (Australian footballer) (born 1955), former VFL player
- Gary Chapman (director) (born 1961), British artist, animator and film director
