= Curry Stone Design Prize =

Architecture award

- Description: Award for innovative excellence in humanitarian and social design
- Country: United States
- Presented by: Curry Stone Foundation
- Reward: Up to US$100,000
- Website: http://currystonedesignprize.com/

The Curry Stone Design Prize was an award given by the Curry Stone Foundation for innovative excellence in humanitarian design. The Prize comes with no restrictions, and is given to design practitioners at many scales, and includes those active in architecture, urban planning, civic engagement, product design and heritage promotion. The prize is awarded annually, with between one and five winners. The Prize’s stated mission is to “highlight, honor, and reward projects that improve daily living conditions for communities around the world.”

To be considered for the Prize, entrants are nominated by a network of leaders in humanitarian and social design. The prizes are awarded by a rotating jury, which itself is selected annually. To date, juries have included over 200 luminaries from the world of design and leaders within the public interest design movement.

Between 2008 and 2017, 26 winners were selected and received awards up to US$100,000.

== Winners ==
Past Winners have included:

Year	Winner
2017	Urban-Think Tank (Hubert Klumpner and Alfredo Brillembourg)
2016	Society for the Promotion of Area Resource Centers (SPARC)
2015	Rural Urban Framework
2014	Studios Kabako
	Proximity Designs
	Studio TAM/Emergency
2013	Hunnarshala
	Architecture for Humanity
2012	Liter of Light
	Riwaq Centre for Architectural Conservation
	Jeanne van Heeswijk
	Center for Urban Pedagogy
	MASS Design Group
2011	Hsieh Ying Chun
	Atelier D'Architecture Autogeree
	Frontline SMS (Ken Banks)
2010	Maya Pedal
	Sustainable Health Enterprises
	Elemental
2009	Alejandro Echeverri and Sergio Fajardo
	Transition Network
	Anna Heringer
2008	Antonio Scarponi
	Shawn Frayne
	Luyanda Mpahlwa
	Marjetica Potrc
	Wes Janz
