= CPSR =

CPSR may refer to:

- Centre for Postgraduate Studies and Research, at Tunku Abdul Rahman University College, Malaysia
- Computer Professionals for Social Responsibility
- Current Program Status Register, an ARM computer processor feature
