= Riwaq =

Riwaq may refer to:

- Riwaq (arcade) or rivaq, an arcade in Islamic architecture
- Riwaq (organization), a center on the West Bank for the preservation of cultural heritage
