= Taxman (disambiguation) =

"Taxman" is a song by The Beatles.

Taxman or The Taxman may also refer to:

- Taxman (occupation) or tax collector, a person collecting unpaid taxes
- Taxman (film), a 1999 film by Avi Nesher
- Taxman (video game), a 1981 video game
- Taxman (mathematical game), a mathematical game by Diane Resek
- Christian Whitehead, or The Taxman, Australian video game programmer and designer
- The Taxman, former hype man for Kottonmouth Kings
- TAXMAN, Thorne McCarty's project on legal informatics

== See also ==
- Tacksman, an intermediate landholder in the Scottish Highlands
