= Quandary =

Quandary may refer to:

- Dr. Quandary, a fictional character in the video game The Secret Island of Dr. Quandary
- Mount Quandary, a mountain of Antarctica
- Quandary Peak, the highest summit of the Tenmile Range in Colorado
