= Oh, For a Man! =

1930 film

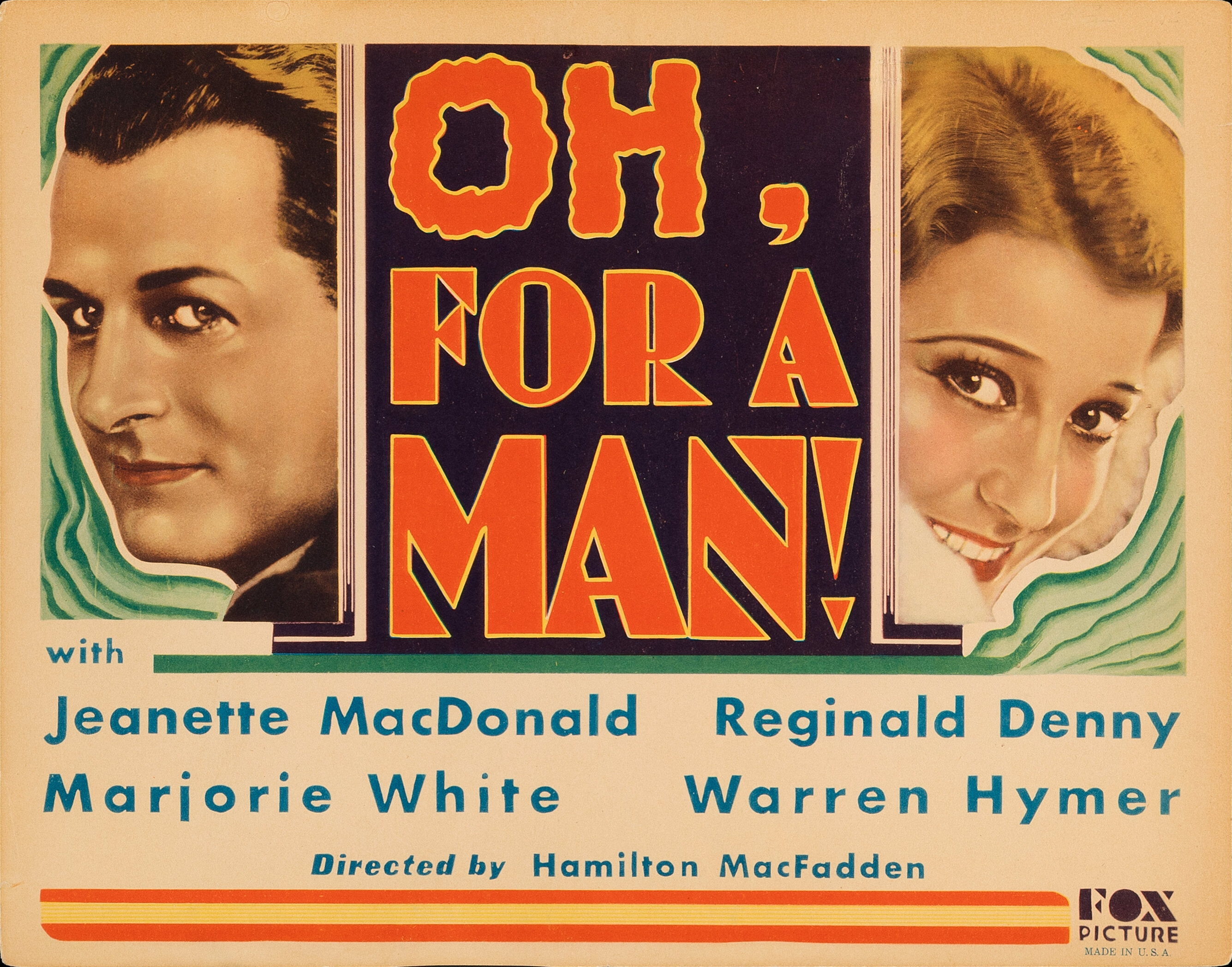
- Lobby card
- Directed by: Hamilton MacFadden
- Written by: Philip Klein; Lynn Starling; Mary Fitch Watkins (short story "Stolen Thunder")
- Produced by: William Fox; Hamilton MacFadden
- Starring: Jeanette MacDonald; Reginald Denny; Warren Hymer; Marjorie White; Bela Lugosi
- Cinematography: Charles G. Clarke
- Edited by: Alfred DeGaetano
- Music by: Peter Brunelli
- Production company: Fox Film Corporation
- Distributed by: Fox Film Corporation
- Release date: November 28, 1930
- Running time: 78 minutes
- Country: United States
- Language: English

Oh, For a Man! is a 1930 American black-and-white musical comedy film based on a short story, "Stolen Thunder" by Mary Fitch Watkins. The original story appeared in The Saturday Evening Post June 7, 1930. Lugosi's character of Frescatti was later added to the screenplay. Well-dressed with a goatee, he resembled his Dr. Benet role in The Invisible Ray (1936) in stills. Since the criminal of the story does not receive just punishment in the end, the producers were years later unable to reissue this film after the establishment of the production code.

Production of the film (originally to be called "Stolen Thunder") began on September 13, 1930. It premiered theatrically on Nov. 28th. Although they lauded the cast, direction and music, most of the critics found the storyline "nothing to rave about" and Reginald Denny's Irish brogue annoying. This was the final film to be produced entirely by William Fox before he lost control of the Fox Film Corporation during a hostile takeover.

== Plot ==
A talented diva named Carlotta Manson steers clear of romantic relationships because she doesn't want to interfere with her career. Bela Lugosi has a relatively small role as her singing teacher, and in one of his only scenes, Carlotta makes a comical remark to him about one of her co-stars smelling like garlic (ironic in light of Lugosi's later involvement with "Dracula"). One night when she returns home, she is robbed by a thief named Barney McGann. When the opera-loving Barney learns his victim is his idol, he befriends her and they begin a romance. Carlotta even gets him a job in the chorus and proposes marriage to him. They go off to an Italian villa, but Barney changes his mind and walks out on her. Carlotta returns to New York to resume her singing career, but later Barney follows her there and they wind up reunited with a kiss.

== Cast ==
- Jeanette MacDonald as Carlotta Manson
- Reginald Denny as Barney McGann
- Warren Hymer as "Pug" Morini
- Marjorie White as Totsy Franklin
- Alison Skipworth as Laura
- Albert Conti as Peck
- Bela Lugosi as Frescatti, a goatee-wearing singing teacher
- André Cheron as Costello
- William B. Davidson as Kerry Stokes
- Donald Hall as Carlotta's Backstage Admirer
- Bodil Rosing as masseuse
- Althea Henley as June, Dowager's homely daughter
- Gino Corrado as Signor Ferrari, Italian Master of Ceremonies (uncredited)
- Mary Gordon as Stage door admirer with violets (uncredited)
- Evelyn Hall as Emily, dressing room dowager (uncredited)

== Soundtrack ==
- "Liebestod"

(uncredited)
from "Tristan und Isolde"
Music by Richard Wagner

- "Im Just Nuts About You"

Written by William Kernell
