= ACM Eugene L. Lawler Award =

- Awarded for: Humanitarian contributions within computer science and informatics
- Country: New York, (United States)
- Presented by: Association for Computing Machinery (ACM)
- Reward: US$5,000
- First award: 1999
- Final award: 2024
- Website: awards.acm.org/lawler

The ACM Eugene L. Lawler Award is awarded every two or three years by the Association for Computing Machinery to an individual or a group of individuals who have made a significant contribution to the use of information technology for humanitarian purposes in a wide range of social domains. It is named after the computer scientist Eugene Lawler. The award includes a financial reward of US$5,000.

== Recipients ==
Year	Recipients	Citation
1999	(United States) Antonia Stone	For her role as founder of Playing to Win and CTCNet
2001	(United States) John Blitch	For his leadership in the prior development and rapid deployment of the urban search and rescue robots used after the September 11 attacks
2003	(United States) Patrick Ball	for his leadership in the creation of open source software
2005	(United States) Ernest Siva, (United States) Solomon Mbuguah, (Switzerland) Albrecht Ehrensperger	For their contributions to the Nakuru Local Urban Observatory project in Kenya
2007	(United States) Randy Wang	For founding and leading the Digital Study Hall Project
2009	(United States) Gregory Abowd	For his work on how advanced information technologies can be used in homes and schools to support people with autism
2012	(Germany) Johannes Schöning, (Germany) Thomas Bartoschek	For their contributions to GI@School (Geoinformatics at Schools), a program that encourages young people to develop a fascination for computer science and computer science research
2014	(United States) Robin Murphy	For her pioneering work in humanitarian disaster response through search and rescue robotics
2016	(United Kingdom) Ken Banks	For developing FrontlineSMS, using mobile technology and text messaging to empower people to share information, organize aid, and reconnect communities during crises.
2018	(India) Meenakshi Balakrishnan	For research, development, and deployment of cost-effective embedded-system and software solutions addressing mobility and education challenges of the visually impaired in the developing world.
2020	(United States) Richard Anderson	For developing a range of innovative applications in health, education, the internet, and financial services, benefiting underserved communities around the globe.
2022	(United States) Jelani Nelson	For founding and developing AddisCoder, a nonprofit organization which teaches programming to underserved students from all over Ethiopia.
2024	(United States) Maja Matarić	For pioneering socially assistive robotics for improving wellness and quality of life for users with special needs.

== See also ==
- List of computer science awards
