= InterWorking Labs =

- Company type: Privately held company
- Industry: Computer networking Wireless networking
- Genre: Application Performance Management, communication protocol, Robustness testing
- Founded: 1993
- Founder: Chris Wellens
- Headquarters: Scotts Valley, California, USA
- Area served: Worldwide
- Key people: Chris Wellens (CEO); Karl Auerbach (CTO)
- Products: Network testing, network emulation, network optimization
- Owner: Chris Wellens (profitable since 1995)
- Number of employees: +20
- Website: www.iwl.com

InterWorking Labs is a privately owned company in Scotts Valley, California, in the business of optimizing application performance for applications and embedded systems. Founded in 1993 by Chris Wellens and Marshall Rose, it was the first company formed specifically to test network protocol compliance. Its products and tests allow computer devices from many different companies to communicate over networks.

== Products ==
InterWorking Labs' Products diagnose, replicate, and re-mediate application performance problems.

The company's first product, SilverCreek, tests a Simple Network Management Protocol (SNMP) agent implementation (switch, server, phone) with hundreds of thousands of individual tests, including conformance, stress, robustness, and negative testing. The tests detect and diagnose implementation errors in private and standard MIBs as well as SNMPv1, v2c, and v3 stacks and implementations.

The Maxwell family products emulate real-world networks, with problems such as delays, rerouting, corruption, impaired packets or protocols, Domain Name System delays or limited bandwidth. New impairments are added to Maxwell using C, C++, or Python extensions. It is controlled via graphical, command line, and script interfaces. It supports a set of protocol impairments for TCP/IP, DHCP, ICMP, TLS, and SIP testing.

The Maxwell products are named after Maxwell's demon, a thought experiment by 19th-century physicist James Clerk Maxwell. Maxwell's demon demonstrated that the second law of thermodynamics—which says that entropy increases—is true only on average. In his thought experiment, Maxwell imagined a double chamber with a uniform mixture of hot and cold gas molecules. A demon (some intelligent being) sits between the two chambers, operating a trap door. Every time a cold (low-energy) molecule comes by, the demon opens the door and lets the molecule through to the other side. Eventually, the cold gas molecules are all on one side of the chamber and the hot ones all on the other. Although the molecules continue to move randomly, the introduction of intelligence into the system reduces entropy instead of increasing it.

The Maxwell product sits in the middle of a network conversation and opens or closes a figurative "door" on the basis of specific criteria. Maxwell intelligently modifies the packet based on pre-selected criteria and sends the packet on its way. InterWorking Labs is advised by the Internet Engineering Task Force (IETF). Maxwell's network emulations reproduce real conditions in the lab before products are deployed.

== History ==
InterWorking Labs was co-founded in 1993 by Chris Wellens and Marshall Rose. The two met in 1992 at the Interop Company, in Mountain View, California, where Wellens was Director of Technology and Rose was on the Interop Program Committee and also Working Group Chair of the IETF for the Simple Network Management Protocol (SNMP).

Wellens—who was overseeing the trade fair's 5000-node InteropNet as well as an array of interoperability demonstrations for network protocols— noticed that engineers from different companies often interpreted network protocols differently and ended up struggling to make their products send and receive data to one another—sometimes just minutes before showcase demonstrations. The engineers asked Interop to create an interoperability lab where these network communication issues could be worked out in a private and less stressful environment. Interop's founder and CEO Dan Lynch concluded that the industry needed an interoperability testing lab.

Lynch asked Wellens to write a business plan for a permanent Interoperability Lab. Rose proposed that the Lab's first task should be to create and try out a set of tests of the SNMP protocol, since SNMP was an area he was familiar with and one where engineers were having particular problems at Interop. Wellens volunteered to organize a group of developers for an interoperability test summit if Rose would create a set of tests and assist in developing the initial plan.

At about the same time, however, Ziff-Davis acquired Interop and chose not to proceed with the Interoperability Lab. Wellens and Lynch agreed that she should pursue the idea on her own. In 1993, Wellens established InterWorking Labs, and, in January 1994, organized the first SNMP interoperability test summit using 50 SNMP tests written by Rose. During that first test summit, a large number of implementations failed Rose's tests. The results persuaded several major corporations that interoperability testing would be a critical component of functioning networks. Participants at the second (1994) SNMP Test Summit included Cabletron Systems, Cisco Systems, Eicon Technology, Empirical Tools and Technologies, Epilogue Technology Corp., Fujitsu OSSI, IBM and IBM Research, Network General Corp., PEER Networks, SNMP Research, SynOptics Communications, TGV, Inc., and Wellfleet Communications.

In 2000, Wellens asked Karl Auerbach to join the InterWorking Labs Board of Directors. In 2002, Wellens hired Auerbach, who was part of Cisco's Advanced Internet Architecture group, to serve as chief technology officer at InterWorking Labs. An advisory board consisted of several members of the IETF who have expertise in networking protocols (Andy Bierman, Jeff Case, Dave Perkins, Randy Presuhn, and Steve Waldbusser).

== Markets ==
Wireless networks used by hospitals, police, and military have turned computer networks into essential lifeline utilities. Computer networks that keep economies, transportation, energy, and food supplies flowing commonly belong to the critical infrastructure of a region. As such, the performance of networks under adverse conditions is a significant concern for militaries, industry, and local and regional governments.

According to Wellens, UCITA has significantly protected software publishers from liability for the failure of their products. But software publishers may become increasingly liable for the consequences of network failures—especially where comprehensive networking testing existed and was not used. Online retailers, for example, can demonstrate multimillion-dollar losses due to network problems such as security flaws or a network collapse after a denial of service attack.
