= Daniel D. McCracken =

American computer scientist, academic, educator and writer

- Born: July 23, 1930; Hughesville, Judith Basin County, Montana, United States
- Died: July 30, 2011 (aged 81); New York City, US
- Education: Central Washington University (B.S., Mathematics and Chemistry, 1951). Union Theological Seminary (M.Div., 1970)
- Occupations: professor, author, and computer scientist
- Known for: Computer pioneer, computer programmer, computer scientist, and author of computer programming books
- Spouse(s): Evelyn Edwards (-her death); Helen Blumenthal (-his death)

Daniel D. McCracken (July 23, 1930 – July 30, 2011) was a computer scientist in the United States. He was a professor of Computer Sciences at the City College of New York, and the author of over two dozen textbooks on computer programming, with an emphasis on guides to programming in widely used languages such as Fortran and COBOL. His A Guide to Fortran Programming (Wiley, 1961) and its successors were the standard textbooks on that language for over two decades. His books have been translated into fourteen languages.

== Career ==
McCracken was born in 1930 in Hughesville, Judith Basin County, Montana, a mining town, and graduated in 1951 from Central Washington University with degrees in mathematics and chemistry. He worked seven years with the General Electric Company in computer applications and programmer training. After that, he worked at the New York University Atomic Energy Commission Computer Center, and was a graduate student at the Courant Institute of Mathematical Sciences. In 1959 he became a consultant and continued writing on computer subjects. In 1970 he earned a Master of Divinity degree from the Union Theological Seminary in New York.

From 1976 to 1978, he was vice president of the Association for Computing Machinery (ACM), from 1978 to 1980 he was president of the ACM, and in 1994 he was inducted as an ACM Fellow. He served as ACM's representative to the Board of Directors of the Institute for Certification of Computing Professionals (ICCP) and was inducted to its hall of fame as an ICCP Fellow in 1998.

He joined the City College of New York Computer Sciences Department in 1981. In 1989 he received the Norbert Wiener Award for Social and Professional Responsibility from Computer Professionals for Social Responsibility.

== Death ==
McCracken died of cancer a week after his 81st birthday on July 30, 2011, in New York City. He was survived by his second wife, Helen Blumenthal, seven children, nine grandchildren, and two great-grandchildren. He was preceded in death by his first wife, Evelyn Edwards, three brothers and two sisters.

== Books ==
- McCracken, Daniel D. (1957). Digital Computer Programming (1 ed.). Wiley.
- McCracken, Daniel D.; Harold Weiss; Tsai H. Lee (1959). Programming Business Computers (1 ed.). Wiley. ASIN B000MFMTLG.
- McCracken, Daniel D. (1961). A Guide to Fortran Programming (1 ed.). Wiley. ASIN B0000EGLDD.
- McCracken, Daniel D. (1962). A Guide to Algol Programming (1 ed.). Wiley.
- McCracken, Daniel D. (1962). A Guide to IBM 1401 Programming (1 ed.). Wiley.
- McCracken, Daniel D. (1963). A Guide to Cobol Programming (1 ed.). Wiley.
- McCracken, Daniel D.; Fred J. Gruenberger (1963). Introduction to Electronic Computing (1 ed.). Wiley.
- McCracken, Daniel D.; William S. Dorn (1964). Numerical Methods and Fortran Programming (1 ed.). Wiley.
- McCracken, Daniel D. (1965). A Programmer's Introduction to the IBM System/360 Architecture, Instructions, and Assembler Language (1 ed.). IBM.
- McCracken, Daniel D. (1965). A Guide to Fortran IV Programming (1 ed.). Wiley. LCCN 65026848.
- McCracken, Daniel D. (1967). Fortran with Engineering Applications (1 ed.). Wiley.
- McCracken, Daniel D.; Umberto Garbassi (1970). A Guide to Cobol Programming (2 ed.). Wiley. ISBN 978-0-471-58244-1.
- McCracken, Daniel D. (1972). To Love or to Perish: The Technological Crisis and the Churches. J. Edward Carothers, Margaret Mead, Roger L. Shinn (eds.) (1 ed.). Friendship Press.
- McCracken, Daniel D.; William S. Dorn (1972). Numerical Methods with Fortran IV Case Studies (1 ed.). Wiley.
- McCracken, Daniel D. (1974). A Simplified Guide to Fortran Programming (1 ed.). Wiley. ISBN 9780471582922.
- McCracken, Daniel D. (1976). A Simplified Guide to Structured Cobol Programming (1 ed.). Wiley.
- McCracken, Daniel D.; William S. Dorn (1976). Introductory Finite Mathematics with Computing (1 ed.). Wiley.
- McCracken, Daniel D. (1978). A Guide to PL/M for Microcomputer Applications (1 ed.). Addison-Wesley.
- McCracken, Daniel D. (1981). A Guide to Nomad for Applications Development (1 ed.). Addison-Wesley.
- McCracken, Daniel D. (1984). Computing for Engineers and Scientists with Fortran 77 (1 ed.). Wiley. ISBN 9780471097013.
- McCracken, Daniel D. (1986). A Second Course in Computer Science with Pascal (1 ed.). Wiley. ASIN B001NBX18S.
- McCracken, Daniel D.; William I. Salmon (1987). A Second Course in Computer Science with Modula-2 [data structures] (1 ed.). Wiley.
- McCracken, Daniel D.; William I. Salmon (1988). Computing for Engineers and Scientists with Fortran 77 (2 ed.). Wiley. ISBN 978-0-471-62552-0.
- McCracken, Daniel D.; Donald G. Golden (1990). Simplified Structured Cobol with Microsoft/MicroFocus Cobol (1 ed.). Wiley. ISBN 978-0-471-51407-7.
- McCracken, Daniel D. (1992). Learning GEL By Example (1 ed.). Gain Technology.
- McCracken, Daniel D.; Rosalee J. Wolfe (2003). User-Centered Website Development: A Human-Computer Interaction Approach (1 ed.). Prentice Hall. ISBN 978-0-13-041161-7.
