= Theodore Postol =

American physicist (born 1946)

Theodore A. Postol
- Born: 30 April 1946 (age 80); Brooklyn, New York, U.S.
- Education: MIT
- Known for: Criticism of U.S. missile defense effectiveness
- Scientific career
- Fields: Physicist and Science and technology studies
- Workplaces: MIT; Stanford; Argonne National Laboratory; Office of the Chief of Naval Operations

Theodore A. Postol (born 30 April 1946) is a professor emeritus of Science, Technology, and International Security at the Massachusetts Institute of Technology (MIT). Prior to his work at MIT, he worked at Argonne National Laboratory, the Pentagon, and Stanford University. He was on the editorial board of the journal Science & Global Security until 2019. Postol is also a prominent critic of U.S. missile defense systems, challenging the technical efficacy of military technologies through independent analysis. Some of this analysis has been criticized by colleagues for errors, flaws in methodology, and factual inaccuracies. According to The Daily Telegraph in 2023, Postol has spent much of his career "trying to make sure that the U.S. doesn't build ballistic missile defences".

Postol rose to national prominence in the early 1990s when he challenged U.S. Army claims regarding the success rate of the MIM-104 Patriot missile during the first Gulf War. While the government initially claimed a near-perfect interception rate, Postol’s analysis—later supported by a House Government Operations Committee investigation—concluded that the actual success rate was likely below 10%. For his work in disclosing misinformation regarding national missile defense, Postol has received numerous honors, including the Leo Szilard Prize (1990) and the Norbert Wiener Award (2001). In recent years, however, Postol’s work has been the subject of significant debate. He has vocally disputed Western intelligence assessments and the findings of the Organisation for the Prohibition of Chemical Weapons regarding chemical weapons attacks in Syria (2013–2019), prompting the Science & Global Security editorial board to reject publication of Postol's article after they "identified a number of issues with the peer-review and revision process", leading to Postol resigning from the editorial board. He has also challenged assessments of North Korean ballistic missile capabilities, though the analysis was criticized by organizations such as Bellingcat and the Middlebury Institute for alleged methodological flaws and data errors, the latter saying that Postol had obtained his results by "work[ing] backwards to create a model that fits his assumptions".

== Background ==
Postol received his undergraduate degree in physics and his PhD in nuclear engineering from MIT. Postol worked at Argonne National Laboratory, where he studied the microscopic dynamics and structure of liquids and disordered solids using neutron, X-ray and light scattering techniques, along with molecular dynamics simulations. He also worked at the Congressional Office of Technology Assessment, where he studied methods of basing the MX missile, and later worked as a scientific adviser to the Chief of Naval Operations.

After leaving the Pentagon, Postol helped to build a program at Stanford University to train mid-career scientists to study weapons technology in relation to defense and arms control policy. In 1990, Postol received the Leo Szilard Prize from the American Physical Society for "incisive technical analysis of national security issues that [have] been vital for informing the public policy debate". In 1995, he received the Hilliard Roderick Prize from the American Association for the Advancement of Science. In 2001, he received the Norbert Wiener Award from Computer Professionals for Social Responsibility for his "courageous efforts to disclose misinformation and falsified test results of the proposed National Missile Defense system". On September 28, 2016 the Federation of American Scientists awarded Postol their annual Richard L. Garwin Award, "that recognizes an individual who, through exceptional achievement in science and technology, has made an outstanding contribution toward the benefit of mankind."

== Patriot missiles in Operation Desert Storm ==
The Patriot Missile was used in the first Gulf War (Operation Desert Storm) to intercept descent-phase SCUD missiles fired by Iraq. The U.S. Army claimed a success rate of 80% in Saudi Arabia and 50% in Israel, claims that were later reduced to 70% and 40%. But President George H.W. Bush claimed a success rate of more than 97% during a speech at Raytheon's Patriot manufacturing plant in Andover, Massachusetts in February 1991, declaring, the "Patriot is 41 for 42: 42 Scuds engaged, 41 intercepted!" In April 1992, Postol told a House committee that "the Patriot's intercept rate during the Gulf War was very low. The evidence from these preliminary studies indicates that Patriot's intercept rate could be much lower than 10 percent, possibly even zero." Postol later criticized the Army's "independent" Analysis of Video Tapes to Assess Patriot Effectiveness as being "seriously compromised" by the "selective" and "arbitrary" use of data. A House Government Operations Committee investigation in 1992 concluded that, contrary to military claims on effectiveness, Patriot missiles destroyed only 9 percent of SCUD missiles during attempts at interception. MIT Technology Review's senior writer, David Talbot, wrote that Postol "debunked claims by the U.S. Army that its Patriot missiles were successfully shooting down Iraqi Scud missiles during the first Gulf War".

== National ballistic missile defense ==
In 1996, Dr. Nira Schwartz, a senior test-engineer at defense contractor TRW blew the whistle on TRW for exaggerating the capabilities of an antiballistic missile sensor. The sensor was subsequently used in a "successful" missile test in 1997. The then-Ballistic Missile Defense Organization launched an investigation in 1998 and asked a Pentagon advisory board called POET (Phase One Engineering Team), which included two staff members from MIT's Lincoln Laboratory, to review performance of TRW software, using data from the 1997 flight test. These engineers concluded in their report that Schwartz's allegations were untrue and despite failure of the sensor, the software "basically worked the way TRW said it worked." In December 1998, TRW's contract was not extended by the government, which chose a competing system built by Raytheon.

In 2000, Schwartz gave Postol an unclassified version of the POET report from which sensitive text and graphs had been removed. Based on this redacted report, he notified the White House and senior MIT officials of possible fraud and research misconduct at TRW and MIT Lincoln Laboratory. The Pentagon responded by classifying the letter and dispatching Defense Security Service members to his office. Three agents of the Defense Security Service arrived unannounced to his campus office and attempted to show him other classified documents, but Postol refused to look at them, saying the visit was meant to silence him, which the Defense Security Service denied.

=== Investigation into TRW/MIT Lincoln Laboratory report ===
Postol demanded the MIT administration under President Charles Vest and Provost Robert Brown investigate possible violations to MIT policies on research misconduct. The administration initially resisted, but later appointed another faculty member to conduct a preliminary investigation. In 2002, this professor's investigation found no evidence of a credible error, but he subsequently recommended a full investigation when Postol provided a statement of additional concerns. A subsequent 18-month investigation by the General Accounting Office in 2002 found widespread technical failures in the anti-missile system, contradicting the original report in 1997. In May 2006, a panel composed of MIT faculty members concluded that the investigator recommended a full investigation "because of his inability to exhaust all the questions that arose during the inquiry," not because it appeared likely misconduct had occurred, and that a full investigation had not been warranted.

Under National Science Foundation regulations governing research misconduct, a preliminary inquiry should be completed within 90 days of an allegation, and a full investigation within 180 days subject to penalties as severe as suspension of federal funding. By December 2004, four years later, no formal investigation had been performed, and the Missile Defense Agency formally rejected MIT's request to investigate the classified data. Postol stated that the MIT administration was compliant with the Pentagon's attempts to cover up a fiasco by dragging its feet on an investigation because defense contracts through Lincoln Laboratory constituted a major portion of MIT's operating budget.

In early 2006, a compromise was reached whereby MIT would halt any attempt to conduct its own investigation and senior Air Force administrator Brendan B. Godfrey and former Lockheed Martin chief executive Norman R. Augustine would lead a final investigation. Postol disputed the impartiality of this new investigation as Augustine was CEO while Lockheed was a contractor with NBMD.

In May 2006, an MIT Ad-Hoc Committee on Research Misconduct Allegation concluded delays in the investigation were caused by a number of factors, including: "initial uncertainty about the applicability of MIT's research misconduct policy to a government [non-MIT] report"; government classification of relevant information, possibly in an attempt to make it unavailable to plaintiffs in the TRW whistle-blower trial; and Postol's failure to provide a clearly written summary of his allegations, which changed repeatedly during the investigation. The committee also found that Postol repeatedly violated MIT confidentiality rules "causing personal distress to the Lincoln Laboratory researchers, their families and colleagues".

=== SM-3 interceptor ===
In September 2009, President Barack Obama announced that his administration was scrapping the Bush administration's proposed anti-ballistic missile shield in Europe and replacing it with reconfigured SM-3 missiles. A "Ballistic Missile Defense Review" was completed in March 2010 concluding that existing ballistic missile defense technologies provided a reliable and robust defense against limited ICBM attacks. In May 2010, Postol and George N. Lewis published an analysis concluding that the majority of SM-3 interceptor tests classified as "successful" actually failed to destroy incoming warheads. The Missile Defense Agency challenged an article in The New York Times which described Postol and Lewis' results, stating that the SM-3 program was one of the most successful programs within the Department of Defense and that The New York Times chose not to publish information supplied by the MDA in response to the allegations made by Postol and Lewis. MDA Chief Spokesman Richard Lehner accused Postol and Lewis of basing "their assessment on publicly released photos gleaned from a sensor mounted aboard the SM-3 and postulat[ing] what they perceived to be the interceptor’s impact point although they had no access to classified telemetry data showing the complete destruction of the target missiles, or subsequent sensor views of the intercept that were not publicly released so as not to reveal to potential adversaries exactly where the target missile was struck."

According to The Daily Telegraph in 2023, Postol has spent much of his career "trying to make sure that the U.S. doesn't build ballistic missile defences". Also in 2023, Postol was accused by other arms control experts of allowing his "long-standing opposition to existing US missile defense programs" to affect his analysis of North Korean missiles.

== Syrian civil war chemical attacks ==
In 2013, Postol and Richard Lloyd, an expert in warhead design at the military contractor Tesla Laboratories, wrote about the Ghouta chemical attack that has taken place during the Syrian civil war. Analysing YouTube footage of the attacks and its aftermath, Postol and Lloyd believed they found a number of items to be inconsistent with the US government's claims about the incident. Postol subsequently worked with Maram Susli to analyze the Ghouta attack.

In 2017, Postol criticized the unclassified intelligence assessment released by the Trump administration blaming the air forces of Syrian President Bashar al-Assad for the April Khan Shaykhun chemical attack. Postol analysed the photographic evidence and concluded that the chemical attack was not an air raid, but was conducted from the ground using most probably an emptied 122mm artillery rocket tube, which is normally used as munition of a multiple rocket launcher, filling it with a chemical agent and detonating it by an explosive charge laid on top of it. On 18 April, Postol published his findings that the crater present in the photographs could not have been the source of the necessary sarin smoke plume, as persons were seen in the video material live at the site, without appropriate protection gear. A sarin smoke plume would have killed them even hours after a sarin gas grenade explosion. On 21 April, he corrected this view in one aspect: "In my earlier report released on April 18, 2017 I misinterpreted the wind-direction convention which resulted in my estimates of plume directions being exactly 180° off in direction", which was however irrelevant for his main statement, that no sarin could have been emitted at the crater-site. Later in April, Postol wrote that the "French Intelligence Report of April 26, 2017 contradicted the White House Intelligence Report of 11 April 2017". The following day he revised his view, saying he had confused the date and location for a different chemical attack four years earlier. Postol stated that none of the forensic evidence in The New York Times video and a follow-on Times news article on the Khan Shaykhun chemical attack supported the conclusions reported by The New York Times.

In 2019, the Princeton based journal Science & Global Security, on whose editorial board Postol sat, intended to publish a report titled "Computational Forensic Analysis for the Chemical Weapons Attack at Khan Sheikhoun on 4 April 2017" about the Khan Shaykhun chemical attack written by Postol, Goong Chen, Cong Gu, Alexey Sergeev, Sanyang Liu, Pengfei Yao and Marlan O. Scully. The report questioned the findings of the OPCW investigation which concluded that the Assad regime had used sarin. The website Bellingcat disagreed with the report's interpretation and stated there were many caveats in the reports analysis. According to Bellingcat, the report's use of simulation was methodologically flawed, as the paper only provided a simulation of a 122mm type rocket, and did not attempt to study other possible options. In response to the Bellingcat article, the editors of Science & Global Security said "Regrettably, the Bellingcat group blog post contains a number of incorrect statements about the contents and conclusions of the paper to be published. Some of the statements appear to refer to an earlier manuscript and do not take account of all the changes made during the peer review and editorial process managed by this journal". The journal later decided not to publish the paper after it "identified a number of issues with the peer-review and revision process". In response Postol, who said he was not involved with the deliberations for the paper, resigned from the journal's editorial board, calling the decision "totally wrong and untenable".

== Iron Dome ==
In July 2014, Postol was quoted in the MIT Technology Review criticising the effectiveness of the Israeli Iron Dome antimissile system. The article received so many negative comments that the website invited Postol to present his evidence. His response, in August, was based on photographic evidence of the system in operation.

== North Korea missile tests ==
In August 2017, Postol shared with Newsweek a paper he co-authored with Markus Schiller and Robert Schmucker of Schmucker Technologies which stated that missiles tested earlier in 2017 by North Korea were incapable of delivering a nuclear warhead to the mainland United States despite being widely described as intercontinental ballistic missiles.

Postol's findings regarding the similarities between the North Korean Hwasong-18 and Russian RT-2PM2 Topol-M intercontinental ballistic missiles were roundly criticized in 2023 by a publication entitled Errors in Postol’s Analysis of the Hwasong-18 from a team of arms control analysts and professors from the Middlebury Institute of International Studies at Monterrey, including Daniel Allen, Madeline Berzak, Michael Duitsman, Decker Eveleth, John Ford, Sam Lair, Jeffrey Lewis, and Tricia White. Postol was accused of "many errors. Most of these errors are careless.... [and] when corrected, demonstrate that Postol’s conclusions are likely wrong." The team further claimed that Postol's analysis "is marred by significant factual inaccuracies. Many of these inaccuracies would have been caught by an analyst carefully looking at the totality of the evidence, rather than simply assuming the missiles are the same," and claimed that "in general, Postol works backwards to create a model that fits his assumptions."

== Books ==
- Blair, Bruce G.; Dean, Jonathan; Fetter, Steve; Goodby, James; Lewis, George N.; Postol, Theodore; Von Hippel, Frank N.; Feiveson, Harold A. (June 1999). The Nuclear Turning Point: A Blueprint for Deep Cuts and De-Alerting of Nuclear Weapons. Brookings Institution Press. ISBN 978-0-8157-0953-4.
