= John Martin (dance critic) =

American journalist (1893–1985)

- Born: 2 June 1893; Louisville, Kentucky
- Died: 19 May 1985 (aged 91); Saratoga Springs, New York
- Occupation: Dance critic

John Martin (June 2, 1893 – May 19, 1985) became America's first major dance critic in 1927. Focusing his efforts on propelling the modern dance movement, he greatly influenced the careers of dancers such as Martha Graham. Within his life he wrote several books on the modern dance and received numerous awards for his work.

== Early life ==
John Martin's life leading up to his career may have led him to the success he later attained. Martin was born June 2, 1893, in Louisville, Kentucky, and was immediately influenced by his mother's love of musical theatre. After his education at the Louisville Male High School, he held several jobs as actor, publicist, and editor in Louisville and New York. During World War I, he served in the Aviation Section of the Army Signal Corps, after which he returned to theatre working with the Chicago Little Theatre where he met his wife Hettie Louise Mick. They married in 1918. He also served as director and press agent for many different theatre projects. Over the years, Martin developed an interest in the actor/director/drama teacher Konstantin Stanislavsky's system which expressed the "dramatic impulses that arise within" Many have claimed that Stanislavsky's ideas influenced Martin's interest in modern dance because it displays this quality.

== Career ==
As a dance critic, Martin fought many preconceived ideas within the newly created genre of writing to become one of the most influential writers in dance history. Before there were actual designated dance critics, music and theatre critics were reluctantly sent to review ballets. Their writing would rant about the music and the symphony while almost completely disregarding the dancing. Following a series of Ted Shawn and Ruth St. Denis Carnegie Hall performances, petitions began to arise in favor of dance critics in New York news papers. The New York Herald Tribune quickly responded with Mary Fitch Watkins and a few weeks later, The New York Times appointed Martin in 1927. Martin saw it as his duty to spread "the gospel of the modern dance." As a dance critic, he and others were convinced they would not become a "subspecies of music criticism" and set out to prove this by educating the audience and the dancers in the ways of professionalism. His efforts brought modern dance to a level equal in stature and independent of music and theatre within the arts.

Because this new dance form was so drastically different from the structured ballet to which people had become accustomed, Martin greatly aided in the development of a vocabulary that suited the developing new modern dance. He pleaded that the audience "lay aside its preconceptions". This "role of the viewer" and other theories were stressed in his lectures at the New School and Bennington. These lectures were soon formed into books, the first of which, The Modern Dance, was published in 1933. Throughout his articles and books Martin developed his ideas of modern dance. He saw the modern movement as truly American because these dancers were driven by their experience. They were their movement conveyed the concerns that arose from their everyday life. He shared the belief that movement stems from the essence of emotion with many modern dancers of that time. He exalted them for their "expression of an inner compulsion." He had high expectations of the dancers and their ability to penetrate the minds of the audience. In turn, he expected the audience to widen their perceptions.

Towards the end of his career, Martin began to ignore the new generation of modern dancers who followed in the pioneers' footsteps because they did not focus on the same quality of essence upon which the first generation built the foundation of modern dance. He eventually turned to ballet criticism for which he was chastised by other critics and modern dancers.

After his retirement in 1962, he taught at the University of California, Los Angeles for five years. Towards the end of his life,, a dancer-choreographer, invited Martin to share a house in Saratoga Springs, New York. Martin lived here until his death May 19, 1985.

== Influence ==
Not only did Martin aid in the progress the modern dance, he also advanced the careers of the choreographers. Martha Graham is among the most well known of these dancers who were advanced professionally by Martin's words. Martin discovered that Graham was the epitome of his theory of modern dance in action. Between 1930 and 1935 there are more articles by Martin on Graham than any other dancer. Perhaps this is because Martin was developing his methodology and used Graham as a focal point for "diagramming and disseminating the form and function of the modern dance."

== Awards and recognition ==
Martin received several awards and honors including a Capezio Dance Award in 1969, two honorary doctorates from Ohio University in 1974 and Skidmore College in 1982, and an exhibition dedicated to his writings by the Dance Collection of the New York Public Library. Most recently, in December 2012, Martin was named one of America's Irreplaceable Dance Treasures by the Dance Heritage Coalition, and his contribution to the development of dance criticism and modern dance is commemorated in the Dance Heritage Coalition's online exhibition of Dance Treasures.

In 1967 he was a Heritage Award recipient of the National Dance Association.

Martin was inducted into the National Museum of Dance's Mr. & Mrs. Cornelius Vanderbilt Whitney Hall of Fame in 1988.

== Publications ==
- The Modern Dance (1933)
- Introduction to the Dance (1939)
- The Dance (1945)
- World Book of Modern Ballet (1952)
