= Ken Banks =

British social entrepreneur

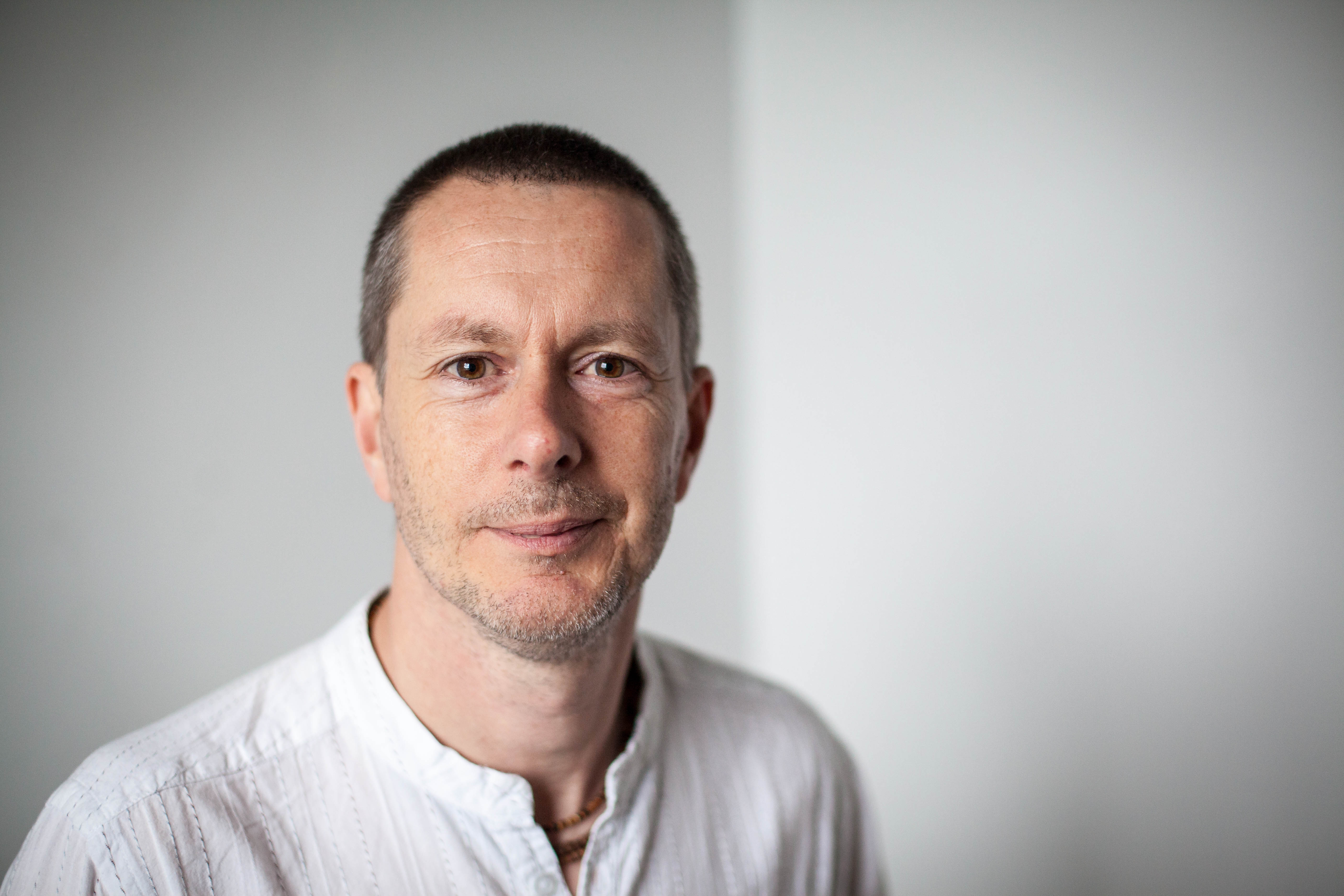
- Ken Banks at PopTech in 2012
- Born: 1966 (age 59–60); Jersey
- Education: University of Sussex
- Occupations: Social entrepreneur, mobile technologist
- Years active: 2002 - present
- Known for: mobile technology
- Title: Founder of kiwanja.net and FrontlineSMS

Ken Banks (born 1966) is a British social entrepreneur and author. He is the creator of FrontlineSMS, a mobile messaging platform that allowed for mass communication in areas with limited or no Internet access. He is also the founder of kiwanja.net, an organisation dedicated to the use of mobile technology for social and environmental change, with a particular focus on Africa.

== Early life and education ==
Banks was born in 1966 in Jersey, Channel Islands. Banks attended Hautlieu School and Highlands College. In 1996 he moved to the UK to study at the University of Sussex, graduating in 1999 with a BA(Hons) in Social Anthropology with Development Studies.

== Career ==
In 2001, Banks took on the role of Project Manager at CERCOPAN, a primate rehabilitation centre in Calabar, southern Nigeria. His time there was cut short by a road traffic accident in 2002, after which he returned to Jersey to recover. Shortly after he was approached by Fauna & Flora International (FFI), an international conservation organisation, and asked to project manage the development of a mobile-based conservation portal funded by a grant from the Vodafone Foundation. wildlive! was officially launched by Sir David Attenborough in December 2003.

In 2003, Banks founded kiwanja.net, an organisation dedicated to the use of mobile technology for social and environmental change, with a particular focus on Africa. During a field trip in 2004, Banks was approached by Kruger National Park officials in South Africa who were looking for an efficient way to use mobile phones to update Bushbuckridge community members on park news. This conversation inspired him to develop FrontlineSMS, a platform that sends and receives text messages (SMS) via mobile phones without requiring internet access, in 2005.

== FrontlineSMS ==
FrontlineSMS was used by a Nigerian organisation called Humanitarian Emancipation Lead Project (HELP) to allow Nigerian citizens to file reports during their 2007 national elections. The story was picked up by the BBC, who interviewed Banks and members of HELP. Their story, Texts monitor Nigerian elections generated global attention in the platform, and user downloads and global interest accelerated as a result. In 2009, Banks began a two-year FrontlineSMS Ambassadors Programme supported by the Clinton Foundation. FrontlineSMS also received financial support from the MacArthur Foundation, Hewlett Foundation, Open Society Institute, Rockefeller Foundation and the Omidyar Network, among others.

== Additional career ==
In 2012, Banks stepped down from the day-to-day running of FrontlineSMS, handing over leadership of the organisation to his senior management team. He transitioned to the role of Chair of the Board. In the same year, Banks launched Means of Exchange, a project focused on rebuilding local communities through technology. One of his first initiatives was a 'cash mob' which took place during the London Olympics.

Over subsequent years he took on a number of new positions including Entrepreneur in Residence at CARE International, Visiting Fellow at RMIT University in Melbourne, Ambassador for International Development at Sussex University and Visiting Fellow at Cambridge Judge Business School. In 2011, Banks was invited to take part in the UK Prime Minister’s business delegation to Africa.

== Books ==
Banks has written widely for the BBC, Guardian, Stanford Social Innovation Review and others, and has authored three books:

- The Rise of the Reluctant Innovator (2013).
- Social Entrepreneurship and Innovation (2016).
- The Pursuit of Purpose (2022).

== Impact ==
In the June 2010 edition of their print magazine, World Watch described Banks as the world's leading voice in promoting mobile phones as an appropriate technology.

== Awards and recognition ==
Banks has been widely recognised by the technology, social entrepreneurship and design communities, and has received numerous national and international awards including:

- 2010: National Geographic Explorer.
- 2011: The Antonio Pizzigati Prize for Software in the Public Interest Award by Tides Foundation.
- 2011: FrontlineSMS awarded Curry Stone Design Prize by Curry Stone Foundation.
- 2016: The ACM Eugene L. Lawler Award by Association for Computing Machinery.
