= Johannes Schöning =

Computer scientist

- Citizenship: Germany
- Education: University of Münster
- Scientific career
- Fields: Human-Computer Interaction, Ubiquitous Computing, Mobile Computing,
- Workplaces: University of St. Gallen, University of Bremen, Hasselt University, University College London, German Research Centre for Artificial Intelligence
- Website: www.johannesschoening.de

Johannes Schöning is a computer scientist best known for his research in human-computer interaction, geoinformatics and mobile computing and was awarded with the ACM Eugene L. Lawler Award for humanitarian contributions within Computer Science and Informatics in 2012 and was named an Association for Computing Machinery distinguished member in 2024. He is a professor at the University of St. Gallen where he directs the HCI group. He is former professor at University of Bremen in Germany. He owns a "Lichtenberg-Professur" of the Volkswagen Foundation.
