= Robin Murphy =

American computer scientist

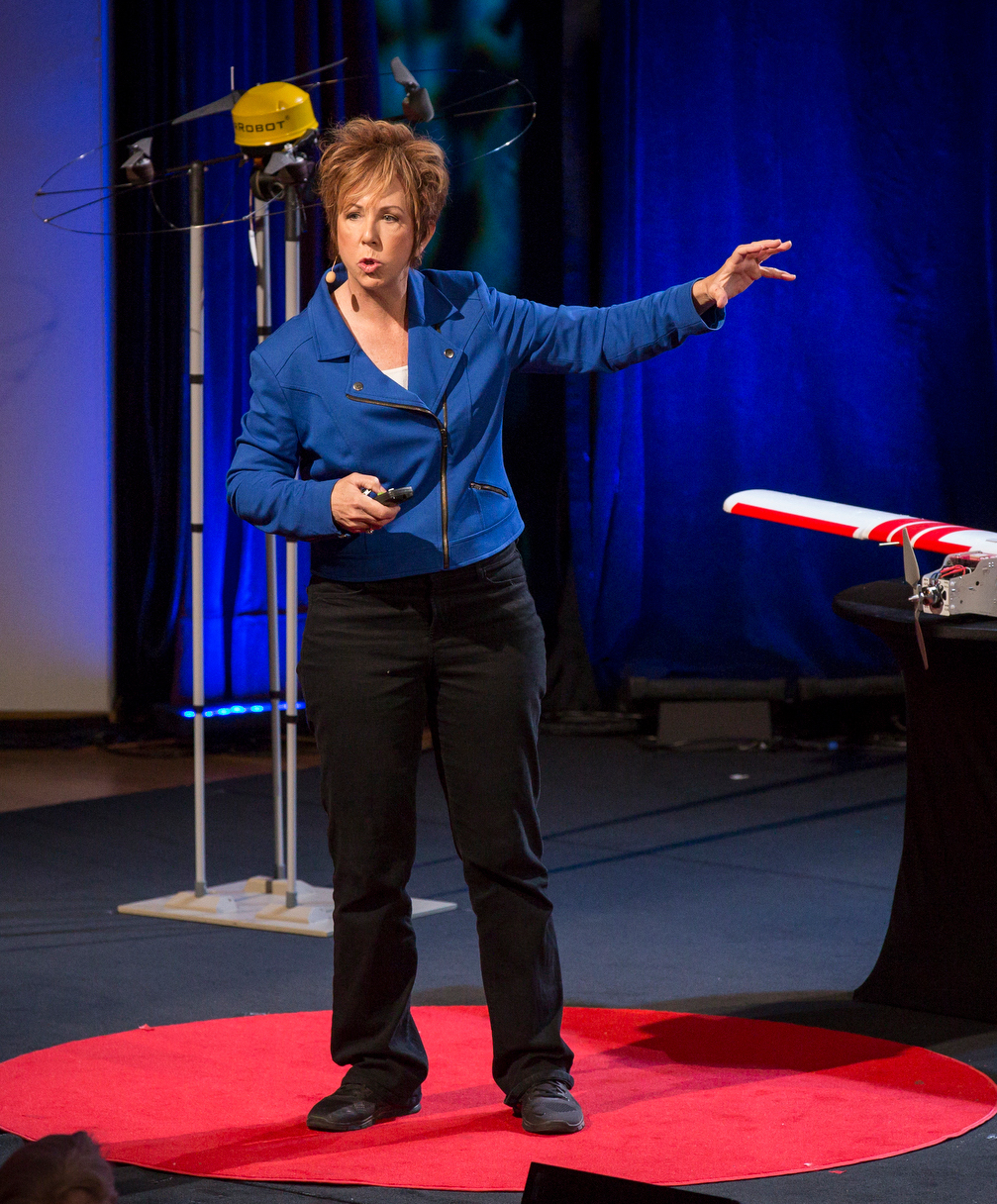
- Dr. Murphy, giving a TED talk on Disaster Robotics
- Born: Robin Roberson Murphy; Douglas, Georgia, U.S.
- Education: Georgia Institute of Technology (BME, MS, PhD)
- Known for: Rescue robotics, Human–robot interaction, Emergency informatics
- Title: Professor Emeritus
- Awards: SEC Professor of the Year (2026); IEEE Fellow; ACM Fellow; AAAS Fellow; Motohiro Kisoi Award (2014)
- Scientific career
- Fields: Computer science, Robotics, Artificial intelligence
- Workplaces: Colorado School of Mines; University of South Florida; Texas A&M University
- Doctoral advisor: Ronald Arkin

Robin Roberson Murphy is an American computer scientist and roboticist. She is the Raytheon Professor of Computer Science and Engineering at Texas A&M University. She is known as a founder of the fields of rescue robotics and human-robot interaction and for inserting robots into disasters. Her case studies of how unmanned systems under perform in the field led cognitive systems engineering researcher David Woods to pose the (Robin) Murphy's Law of Autonomy: a deployment of robotic systems will fall short of the target level of autonomy, creating or exacerbating a shortfall in mechanisms for coordination with human problem holders. Her TED talk “These Robots Come to the Rescue After a Disaster” was listed in TED Talks: The Official TED Guide to Public Speaking as one of the examples of a good TED talk. Murphy is also known for using science fiction as an innovative method of teaching artificial intelligence and robotics.

== Early years and education ==
Murphy was raised in Douglas, Georgia. Her father, a lead engineer at a local poultry facility, was one of Murphy's inspirations. She received her bachelor's degree in mechanical engineering from the Georgia Institute of Technology in 1980, worked in the process safety industry, and returned to Georgia Tech for a master's (1988) and PhD. (1992) in computer science under the direction of Ronald Arkin. She was the first person to graduate from the Georgia Tech College of Computing with a PhD in robotics. She was an assistant professor at the Colorado School of Mines from 1992 to 1998, then moved to the University of South Florida as an associate professor in 1998 and was promoted to full professor in 2003. In 2008, Murphy moved to Texas A&M University. She was a member of the Defense Science Study Group from 1997 to 1998; this led to her involvement on numerous science boards, including the Defense Science Board and the US Air Force Scientific Advisory Board.

== Career in robotics ==
=== Disaster robotics ===
Murphy began research into disaster robotics in 1995, motivated by the Oklahoma City bombing. Murphy was the director of the Center for Robot-Assisted Search and Rescue (CRASASR) from 2002 to 2018, and now serves as the vice-president. Through CRASAR she participated in the 9/11 World Trade Center disaster (2001) rescue efforts, considered the first use of robots for the emergency response phase of a disaster. Since then she has helped insert unmanned ground, aerial, and marine systems into 27 disasters including Hurricane Katrina, which is considered the first use of small unmanned aerial systems, the Fukishima Daiichi nuclear accident (2011), the Tōhoku tsunami (2011), the Syrian Boat Refugee crisis (2016), and Hurricane Harvey (2017). She wrote the seminal text Disaster Robotics, MIT Press, in 2014.

=== Science fiction ===
- Murphy's book, Artificial Intelligence and Mobile Robotics: Case Studies of Successful Systems was cited by Michael Crichton in Prey.
- She inspired the character of Jae, a rescue roboticist who worked at Disaster City, in Skinner, a science fiction book by Charlie Huston.
- Murphy has edited a book, Robotics Through Science Fiction: Artificial Intelligence Explained Through Six Classic Robot Short Stories by Isaac Asimov, Brian Aldiss, Vernor Vinge, and Philip K. Dick, to illustrate key principles in programming artificial intelligence for robotics. The book was originally intended as a companion to the second edition of her textbook Introduction to AI Robotics but it serves as a stand-alone book for a non-technical audience.
- Since 2018, she writes monthly 'science fiction science fact' focus articles for Science Robotics analyzing the realism of robots in the media including Star Wars and Westworld.
- Her blog Robotics Through Science Fiction discusses the scientific accuracy of books and movies.

=== Awards and honors ===
- She was named to the 2021 class of Fellows of the American Association for the Advancement of Science.
- She was elected as an ACM Fellow in 2019 "for contributions in founding and advancing the field of computing for disasters and robotics".
- In 2014, Murphy received the Association for Computing Machinery Eugene L. Lawler Award for Humanitarian Contributions within Computer Science and Informatics. Her humanitarian work has been honored with the 2009 Motohiro Kisoi Award for academic contributions to rescue engineering and the AUVSI Foundation's Al Aube Outstanding Contributor Award in 2008.
- In 2010, she was made an IEEE Fellow “for contributions to rescue robotics and insertion of robots into major disasters.”
- Her book Disaster Robotics, MIT Press 2014, won an Honorable mention 2015 American Publishers Awards PROSE Award for best writing in Engineering and Technology.
- Her work on government boards led to the US Air Force Exemplary Civilian Service Award in 2005.
- Murphy is frequently cited in the popular press as a WIRED Magazine 'AlphaGeek', one of 15 innovators reshaping Texas, one of the 30 Most Innovative Women Professors Alive Today by The Best Master’s Degrees and one of the most influential women in technology.
- Murphy was featured in the documentary short film and web film, Living with Robots (Honda), shown at the 2010 Sundance Film Festival, with a 90-second version distributed to national movie theaters preceding Inception.

== Bibliography ==
- Robotics Through Science Fiction (2018)
- Introduction to AI Robotics (2001, 2018)
- Disaster Robotics (2014)
- The Role of Autonomy in DOD Systems, Task Force Defense Science Board (2012)
- Artificial Intelligence and Mobile Robotics: Case Studies of Successful Systems (with D. Kortenkamp and P. Bonasso) (1998)
