= Maja Matarić =

American computer scientist

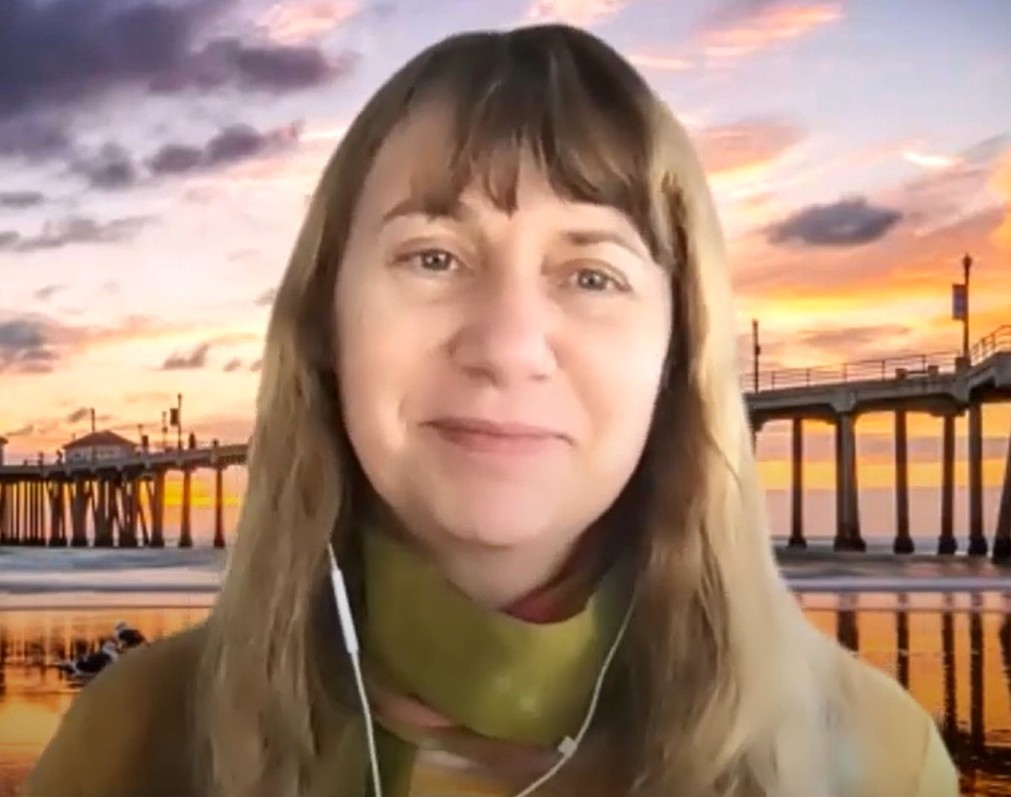
- Matarić speaks at UCLA Library R.U.R. centennial in 2021
- Born: Belgrade, Yugoslavia (now Serbia)
- Education: University of Kansas (B.S.); Massachusetts Institute of Technology (M.S., Ph.D.)
- Known for: Socially assistive robotics, human–robot interaction, swarm robotics
- Awards: Member of the National Academy of Engineering (2025); ACM Eugene L. Lawler Award for Humanitarian Contributions Within Computer Science and Informatics (2025); ACM Athena Lecturer (2024–2025); Member of the American Academy of Arts and Sciences (2023); Fellow of the ACM (2020); Fellow of the AAAI (2016); Fellow of the IEEE (2011); Presidential Award for Excellence in Science, Mathematics, and Engineering Mentoring (2009); Fellow of the AAAS (2007)
- Scientific career
- Fields: Computer science, Robotics, Artificial intelligence
- Workplaces: University of Southern California
- Doctoral advisor: Rodney Brooks
- Website: maja-mataric.web.app

Maja J. Matarić is an American computer scientist. She is the Chan Soon-Shiong Endowed Chair and Distinguished Professor of Computer Science, with courtesy appointments in Neuroscience and in Pediatrics, at the University of Southern California. She is a founding pioneer of the field of socially assistive robotics, and author of the book The Robotics Primer (MIT Press).

== Biography ==
=== Early life and education ===
Maja Matarić was born in Belgrade, in the former Yugoslavia, now Serbia. She immigrated to the United States in her teens, with her mother, Mirjana N. Matarić, who was an accomplished author and educator. Her father, an electrical engineer, passed away from cancer before they immigrated.

Matarić received a Bachelor of Science degree in Computer Science from the University of Kansas in 1987, with a minor in Psychology/Cognitive Science. She received a Master of Science in Computer Science and AI in 1990 and a Doctor of Philosophy in Computer Science and AI in 1994, both from MIT. Her master's thesis was titled "A Model for Distributed Mobile Robot Environment Learning and Navigation" and her doctoral dissertation was titled "Interaction and Intelligent Behavior". Her master's and doctoral advisor was Prof. Rodney A. Brooks.

=== Career ===
Matarić started her academic career as an assistant professor in the Computer Science Department at Brandeis University, where she founded her Interaction Lab. She moved to the University of Southern California (USC) in 1997. At USC, she was the founding director of the USC Robotics and Autonomous Systems Center (RASC), and the co-director of the USC Robotics Lab, in addition to continuing to grow her Interaction Lab.

After obtaining tenure, Matarić also became actively involved in university leadership: she served as the elected president of the faculty and the Academic Senate (2006-2007), as the Vice Dean of Research in the USC Viterbi School of Engineering (2006-2019), and then as the interim USC Vice President of Research (2019-2020). Matarić was a visiting faculty researcher at Google in 2022, and then spent her two-year sabbatical as a Principal Scientist at Google DeepMind.

=== Organizations ===
Matarić is a member of the National Academy of Engineering (NAE) and the American Academy of Arts and Sciences (AMACAD). She is a fellow of AAAS, ACM, AAAI, and IEEE. She was also the recipient of an NSF Career Award (1996) and the Presidential Award for Excellence in Science, Mathematics, and Engineering Mentoring (PAESMEM, 2011), the ACM Athena Lecturer Award (2024), and the ACM Eugene L. Lawler Award for Humanitarian Computing (2025), among others (see Awards section below).

== Research ==
Matarić has published extensively and is highly cited across the fields of robotics, artificial intelligence (AI), and machine learning.

=== Behavior-Based Control and Learning ===
Beginning with her graduate work at MIT, Matarić made fundamental contributions to the understanding of autonomous robot cognition and interaction. For her master's degree, she was the first to demonstrate that behavior-based systems (BBS) could be endowed with representation and thus have the expressive power to plan and learn. Her well-known robot system, Toto, was the first behavior-based system to learn maps online and optimize its behavior. It is highly cited and remains one of the milestones in BBS.

=== Multi-Robot Coordination: Distributed Robot Teams and Swarms ===
In her PhD work, Matarić was one of the first to work on decentralized, distributed algorithms for robot teams and robot swarms that leveraged scalable local control. She enabled a team of 20 physical robots to interact and cooperate on tasks such as coordinated exploration, foraging, organizing in formations, and homing. Prior to her PhD work, nearly all research in robotics was restricted to single robots or pairs. She made pioneering contributions to the theory and practice of multi-robot coordination by showing that complex behaviors could be composed of basis behaviors in a principled way, bringing rigor to the then nascent discipline of distributed robotics.

Matarić's next major contributions came as a faculty member, and focused on distributed robotics, also called multi-robot coordination and learning. Her work provided the first formal analysis of existing multi-robot coordination approaches, elucidating formal and practical limitations, then addressed those limitations by contributing provably correct yet scalable task allocation algorithms for multi-robot control. Her research group developed efficient principled market-based strategies in physical real-world validated multi-robot systems performing a variety of tasks including object transport, area cleanup, and reconnaissance. Her group's work also demonstrated analytical methods for automatically generating minimalist multi-robot controllers with provable properties. Finally, Matarić's research lab, the Interaction Lab, demonstrated both theoretically and experimentally the viability of online real-time learning in distributed multi-robot systems. Her Interaction Lab developed algorithms for model learning within a team, learning by imitation, and learning through human-robot interaction. She was a pioneer and an established leader in multi-robot coordination, which is now a large and thriving area of robotics.

=== Socially Assistive Robotics ===
Matarić's research since 2000 has been in the new field of socially assistive robotics (SAR), which she pioneered (with Prof. Brian Scassellati). Socially assistive robotics aims to enable intelligent machines to help people help themselves through personalized, assistive social (rather than physical) interactions. This research both gains novel insights into human behavior through human-machine interaction and develops robotic systems that use human-robot interaction (HRI) to provide personalized assistance in convalescence, rehabilitation, training, and education.

Since 2000, Matarić's Interaction Lab has developed intelligent HRI and SAR algorithms and methods capable of real-time perception, user modeling, and learning in complex, dynamic, and uncertain human environments. Notably, Mataric's work is known for validation and evaluation with challenging beneficiary populations, including in post-stroke rehabilitation, cognitive and social skill training for children with autism spectrum disorders, cognitive and movement exercises for healthy elderly users and those with Alzheimer's Disease, attention support for studying for students with ADHD, and personalized therapy for users with anxiety and/or depression. This work is conducted through some of the longest studies and data collections in real-world, challenging environments such as schools, therapy centers, rehabilitation clinics, nursing homes, and private homes.

Mataric's work has the potential for major impact on the way health care is delivered to large populations, and on how affordable and accessible care, education, and training can become, through human-centered use of AI and other technologies. By focusing on human augmentation rather than automation, her research has promising implications on the future of work, with broad-reaching interdisciplinary impact.

=== AI and Machine Learning ===
Mataric's entire research career has been in AI and Machine Learning (ML), from her MS thesis on learning spatial representations, to her PhD work on robot teams, through her lab's work on robot learning within a team, learning by imitation, and learning through human-robot interaction, to the work on understanding human activity for human-robot interaction. Her work in socially assistive systems has focused on developing personalized diagnostic and assistive and therapeutic interactions in a variety of domains (early child development, autism therapy, pain management, cerebral palsy therapy, ADHD and anxiety support, stroke rehabilitation, and dementia detection and support) by studying and developing models for understanding and supporting key behavioral capabilities and predictors, including personality, engagement, and motivation. Her work has spanned deep learning & small and large models, continuing to contribute to the rapidly evolving AI landscape.

=== Service to the Research Community ===
Matarić has served the computing, AI, and robotics communities through numerous organizational committees as well as in advisory roles, including serving on the National Science Foundation CISE Advisory Committee, the Computing Community Consortium (CCC) Council, the Scientific Advisory Board of the Max Planck Institute for Intelligent Systems, the DARPA Information Science and Technology (ISAT) Study Group, the US Scientific Advisory Council, Nature and Scientific American (Springer), and the AAAS Leshner Leadership Institute, among others.

== Mentoring ==
Matarić has had a life-long commitment to highly active mentoring and outreach. She started mentoring undergraduate students and K-12/pre-university students as an assistant professor. Throughout her career, she has mentored and placed women students and members of other underrepresented groups in graduate programs and faculty positions world-wide. She has also mentored junior women researchers via CRA programs and local and national programs and panels. When serving in university leadership roles (as dean of research and then vice president of research), she established permanent university mentoring centers and programs for students and faculty.

Matarić is also an active leader in K-12 STEM outreach and innovation. For over two decades, she ran federally-funded programs that provided research experiences for both K-12 teachers and students, in order to expand their horizons about cutting edge advancements and opportunities in computing, using robotics and AI as both topics and tools for learning. She led and significantly grew the USC Viterbi School of Engineering K-12 STEM Center that informed over 10,000 K-12 students and teachers per year.

In recognition of these long-standing efforts, she received the Presidential Award for Excellence in Science, Mathematics, and Engineering Mentoring from President Obama in 2011, along with other mentoring awards (see Awards section).

== Awards ==
A select list of her awards include:

- Member, National Academy of Engineering (NAE), 2025–present
- MassRobotics Medal, 2025
- ACM Eugene L. Lawler Award, 2025
- ACM Athena Lecturer Award, 2024–2025
- Member, American Academy of Arts and Sciences, 2023–present
- Fellow, ACM, 2021–present
- ACM Distinguished Speaker, 2021–present
- USC Distinguished Professor, 2019–present
- Fellow, Association for the Advancement of Artificial Intelligence (AAAI), 2017–present
- Communication and Leadership Award, Toastmasters International Founder's District, 2016
- Top 100 Inspiring Women in STEM Award, Insight into Diversity, 2015
- Orange County Engineers Council Outstanding STEM Program Award, 2015
- Anita Borg Institute Women of Vision Award in Innovation, 2013
- Chan Soon-Shiong Inaugural Chair in Computer Science, 2012–present
- U.S. Presidential Award for Excellence in Science, Mathematics, and Engineering Mentoring (PAESMEM), 2011
- USC Provost's Mentoring Award, 2011
- Nikola Tesla Serbian Diaspora Award, 2011
- Fellow, IEEE, 2010–present
- USC Remarkable Woman Award, 2010
- USC Mellon Mentoring Award, 2009
- USC Academic Senate Distinguished Faculty Service Award, 2009
- Fellow, American Association for the Advancement of Science (AAAS), 2007–present
- The Honor Society of Phi Kappa Phi, 2006
- USC Innovative Undergraduate Teaching Award, 2006–2007
- USC Viterbi School of Engineering Service Award, 2005
- Okawa Foundation Grant, 2004
- USC Provost's Fellowship from the Center for Interdisciplinary Research, 2002–2003
- USC School of Engineering Junior Research Award, 2000
- IEEE Robotics and Automation Society Early Career Award, 2000
- MIT Technology Review TR35 Innovation Award, 1999
- USC Innovative Undergraduate Teaching Award, 1999–2000
- NSF CAREER Award, 1996–2001
- Sigma Xi, 1993–2003
- GE Foundation Faculty for the Future Fellowship, 1990–1991
- NCR Graduate Engineering Fellowship, 1987–1988
- Adolph J. Spangler Scholarship, 1986–1987
- Phi Kappa Phi Honors Society, 1986
- Pi Beta Phi Scholarship, 1986
- W. R. Gregory and E. V. Berger Scholarship, 1985
- State of Kansas Scholarship, 1983–1986

== Book ==
- Matarić, Maja J. (2007). The Robotics Primer. MIT Press. ISBN 9780262633543.
