= Gary Chapman (CPSR) =

Gary Chapman (1952 – 14 December 2010) was the first executive director of Computer Professionals for Social Responsibility (CPSR).

Chapman lectured at the Lyndon B. Johnson School of Public Affairs in Austin, Texas where he was Director of The 21st Century Project.

He was the last recipient of the Norbert Wiener Award for Social and Professional Responsibility when the CPSR was dissolved in May 2013.

He died of a heart attack while on a kayaking trip in Guatemala.

== Bibliography ==
- Chapman, Gary, ed. (1987), Computers in Battle: Will They Work, Harcourt, ISBN 978-0151212323
- Chapman, Gary (1993), The 21st Century Project: Setting a New Course for Science and Technology Policy, CPSR, ASIN B0006F5IGK
- Chapman, Gary, "The Good Life", Public Sphere Project, Schuler
