= Gary Chapman (Australian footballer) =

Australian rules footballer

Personal information
- Full name: Gary Chapman
- Born: 25 September 1955 (age 71)
- Height: 180 cm (5 ft 11 in)
- Weight: 83 kg (183 lb)

Playing career^{1}
Years	Club	Games (Goals)
1976–1978	Fitzroy	16 (17)
- ^{1} Playing statistics correct to the end of 1978.

Gary Chapman (born 25 September 1955) is a former Australian rules footballer who played for the Fitzroy Football Club in the Victorian Football League (VFL).
