= Socially assistive robot =

Sub-field of robotics

A socially assistive robot (SAR) aids users through social engagement and support rather than through physical tasks and interactions.

== Background ==
The field of socially assistive robotics emerged in the early 2000s, following the emergence of the field of social robots. In contrast to social robots, SARs aid users with specific goals related to behavior change rather than serving as purely social entities. The term "Socially assistive robot" was initially defined by Maja Matarić and David Feil-Seifer in 2005. Since its inception, the field has gained substantial recognition, featuring numerous research projects, a wealth of global research publications, startup companies, and a growing array of products on the consumer market.

The COVID-19 pandemic has underscored the immense potential of socially assistive robots, particularly in addressing the needs of large user populations, including children engaged in remote learning, elderly individuals grappling with loneliness, and those affected by social isolation and its associated negative consequences.

== Characteristics of interaction ==
SARs rely on artificial intelligence (AI) to generate real-time, responsive, natural, and meaningful robot behaviors during interactions with humans. The robots employ various forms of communication, such as facial expressions, gestures, body movements, and speech. In contrast to robots intended for physical tasks, SARs are designed to support and motivate users to perform their own tasks. The tasks a user engages in can be physical (e.g., rehabilitation exercises for post-stroke users), cognitive (e.g., dementia screening for elderly users), or social (e.g., turn-taking for users with autism spectrum disorders). This complex interaction involves detecting and interpreting the user's movement, behavior, intent, goals, speech, and preferences. Machine learning and robot learning techniques are frequently employed to enhance the robot's understanding of the user, predict user preferences, and provide effective assistance.

The effectiveness of socially assistive robots is assessed based on objective measurements of user performance and improvement resulting from the robot’s assistance and support. Unlike other branches of robotics, where effectiveness depends on the robot's physical task completion, SAR measures the success of the robot based on the user's progress and achievements. This evaluation is carried out using quantitative objective metrics, such as time spent on tasks, accuracy, retention, and verbalization, as well as quantitative subjective metrics, such as user survey tools.

SAR is based on the large body of evidence showing that users tend to respond more positively to interactions with physical robots compared to interactions with screens. Interaction with physical robots also encourages users to learn and retain more information than screen-based interactions. This fundamental insight underlines why physical robots in SAR applications are more effective, as opposed to interactions solely involving screens, tablets, or computers.

== Uses and applications ==
SARs have been developed and validated in a wide array of applications, including healthcare, elder care, education, and training. For example, SARs have been developed to support children on the autism spectrum in acquiring and practicing social and cognitive skills, to motivate and coach stroke patients throughout their rehabilitation exercises, monitoring individuals health (ex. fall detection), and to encourage elderly users to be more physically and socially active.

There is a concern that technophobia and lack of trust in robots will pose a barrier to the effectiveness of SARs in older adults.
