= Norbert Wiener Award for Social and Professional Responsibility =

The Norbert Wiener Award for Social and Professional Responsibility was established in 1987 in honor of Norbert Wiener to recognize contributions by computer professionals to socially responsible use of computers. It was awarded annually by CPSR, Computer Professionals for Social Responsibility, until that organization disbanded in 2013. The award is now managed by the IEEE Society for the Social Implications of Technology.

== Winners ==
- 1987: David Parnas
- 1988: Joseph Weizenbaum
- 1989: Daniel McCracken
- 1990: Kristen Nygaard
- 1991: Severo Ornstein and Laura Gould
- 1992: Barbara Simons
- 1993: Institute for Global Communications
- 1994: Antonia Stone
- 1995: Tom Grundner
- 1996: Phil Zimmermann
- 1997: Peter Neumann
- 1998: Internet Engineering Task Force
- 1999: The Free Software & Open Source Movements
- 2000: Marc Rotenberg
- 2001: Nira Schwartz and Theodore Postol
- 2002: Karl Auerbach
- 2003: Mitch Kapor
- 2004: Barry Steinhardt
- 2005: Douglas Engelbart
- 2008: Bruce Schneier
- 2013: Gary Chapman
- 2021: Moshe Vardi
- 2023: Guru Madhavan

== See also ==
- Norbert Wiener Prize in Applied Mathematics
- List of computer-related awards
- Prizes named after people
