= New Canaan Historical Society =

American nonprofit organization

Coordinates: 41.1500°N 73.4964°W

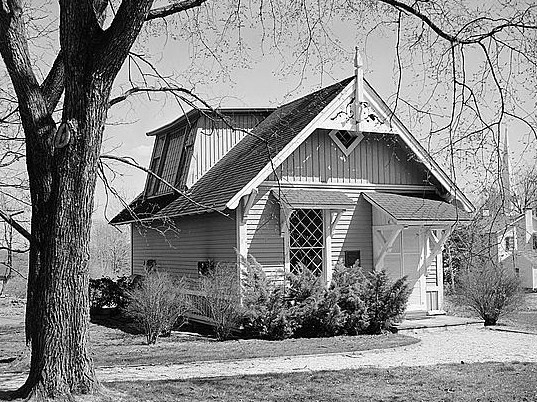
- John Rogers Studio
- Formation: May 18, 1893; 132 years ago (Incorporation)
- Headquarters: 13 Oenoke Ridge; New Canaan, Connecticut, U.S. 06840
- President: Thomas Monahan
- Website: Official website

New Canaan Historical Society (also referred to as New Canaan Museum and Historical Society) in New Canaan, Connecticut, is an independent 501(c)(3) nonprofit organization which was originally formed in 1889 (incorporated 1893) to "bring together the genealogies of the families who have lived in the town, to form a library and collect relicts and curiosities, to form a museum". Today, the society is headquartered at the John Rogers Studio and is dedicated on preserving history as well as organizing educational events.

== See also ==
- List of historical societies in Connecticut
