= Karl Auerbach =

American lawyer

- Born: December 27, 1949 (age 76); Los Angeles, California
- Education: UC Berkeley, Loyola Law School
- Occupation: CTO
- Employer: InterWorking Labs
- Title: CTO, InterWorking Labs
- Spouse: Chris Wellens, CEO of InterWorking Labs
- Website: www.cavebear.com

Karl George Auerbach (born December 27, 1949, in Los Angeles, California) is a California attorney and internet protocol engineer who made many significant contributions to the development of the Internet, Internet governance and the commercialization of many internet technologies. Mr. Auerbach is also known for suing the Internet Corporation for Assigned Names and Numbers (ICANN)—of which he was an elected board member—for refusing to share corporate records in 2002. ICANN controls the assignment of domain names and IP addresses.

== Profile ==
Auerbach is Chief Technology Officer at InterWorking Labs, in Scotts Valley, California, which creates network testing and emulation products. Auerbach has been involved in Internet design since the early 1970s. He is a member of the Intellectual Property section of the California State Bar; on the board of directors of the Open Voting Consortium; a co-founder of the Boston Working Group, a public policy organization devoted to democratic Internet governance; and a member of the volunteer Internet Engineering Task Force (IETF), which develops and promotes Internet standards such as TCP/IP. Auerbach has testified about Internet protocols and policies before Congress on several occasions. In 2001, Auerbach was the Caltech-Loyola Law School Program for Law & Technology Yuen Fellow, speaking on the importance of internet governance.

Mr. Auerbach was a founder of Epilogue Technology Corporation and developed the first commercial SNMP engine that was widely licensed and incorporated in network products. Epilogue was acquired by Integrated Systems.

Mr. Auerbach founded Empirical Tools and Technologies, Inc. (ET&T), also known as Empirical Tools and Toys or ETNT, in 1991 which released Dr. Watson, the Network Detective's Assistant (DWTNDA), a low cost network analysis and diagnostic tool, in 1993. DWTNDA was intended to be an internet "buttset" (Lineman's handset). DWTNDA was intended to be a very portable, fast-to-start, fast-to-use unit to do network troubleshooting. DWTNDA received the LAN magazine Products of the Year award in 1994. ET&T was acquired.

Mr. Auerbach was the editor of RFC 1001/1002, IETF full Internet Standards to provide a NetBIOS service over TCP. In keeping with the practices of the time, Mr. Auerbach listed himself as the editor, not the author, preferring to give recognition to all the contributors.

In the March 1995 issue of LAN Magazine Mr. Auerbach wrote an article about network testing titled "Trouble-Busters: Does your TCP/IP stand for trouble on your network? Here are some insider tricks for diagnosing and repairing TCP/IP Networks."

In 1995, Auerbach became the principal software engineer and first paid employee at Precept Software, which created IPTV and was acquired by Cisco Systems in 1998. At Cisco, Auerbach was a member of the Advanced Internet Architectures group/Chief Strategy Office until mid-2001, when he left Cisco to join InterWorking Labs.

In 2011, Auerbach proposed an amendment to the United States Constitution that would eliminate the recognition of corporations and other group entities as persons or citizens. The text reads as follows:

"Corporate and other aggregate forms of organization are neither Persons nor Citizens under this Constitution and shall have neither protections, rights, nor legal standing under this Constitution.

This Amendment shall not be construed to deny or disparage the power of Congress or the Several States to enact legislation that defines rights, powers, limitations, liabilities, and standing of such corporate and other aggregate forms of organization."

== Early life ==
Auerbach attended Van Nuys High School, in Southern California; graduated from UC Berkeley in 1971; and completed his Juris Doctor cum laude from Loyola Marymount University, in Los Angeles in 1978. He joined the California State Bar in 1978. In 1995, he and Chris Wellens married.

== ICANN suit ==
In 2000, Auerbach was elected by a public vote to the board of directors of ICANN, the Internet Corporation for Assigned Names and Numbers, as the at-large representative for North America. ICANN is a non-profit corporation responsible for Internet protocol (IP) addressing and the domain name system (DNS), including approving new generic top-level domains such as .net and .biz.

In November, 2000, shortly after Auerbach's public election to the ICANN board of directors, he asked to see the non-profit's internal financial and other corporate records, which, under California law, he was entitled to see. ICANN initially resisted, then subsequently consented on condition that Auerbach agree, in writing, to extensive restrictions. Auerbach refused to agree to any restrictions, including limitations on what he could see, the right to copy documents, and non-disclosure.

On March 18, 2002, after 10 months, Auerbach filed suit against ICANN in Los Angeles, with legal representation provided by the Electronic Frontier Foundation. Auerbach argued that as a member of the board of directors of ICANN, he needed to see ICANN's records in order to make "informed and intelligent" decisions. On July 29, 2002, Superior Court Judge Dzintra Janavs ordered ICANN to open its records to Auerbach by August 9, and stated that ICANN board members could not be denied their right under California law to review financial records, travel logs, legal contracts and other internal documents.

== See also ==
- Norbert Wiener Award for Social and Professional Responsibility
