= David Parnas =

Canadian software engineer

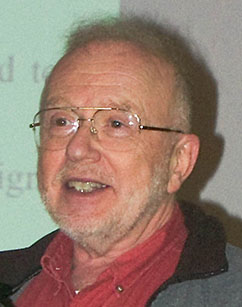
- Born: February 10, 1941 (age 85); Plattsburgh, New York, United States
- Known for: Information hiding, Strategic Defense Initiative activism
- Scientific career
- Doctoral advisor: Alan Perlis; Everard Mott Williams
- Doctoral students: Richard J. Lipton; Steven M. Bellovin

David Lorge Parnas (born February 10, 1941) is a Canadian early pioneer of software engineering, who developed the concept of information hiding in modular programming, which is an important element of object-oriented programming today. He is also noted for his advocacy of precise documentation.

== Life ==
Parnas earned his PhD at Carnegie Mellon University in electrical engineering. Parnas also earned a professional engineering license in Canada and was one of the first to apply traditional engineering principles to software design. He worked there as a professor for many years. He also taught at the University of North Carolina at Chapel Hill (U.S.), at the Department of Computer Science of the Technische Universität Darmstadt (Germany), the University of Victoria (British Columbia, Canada), Queen's University in Kingston, Ontario, McMaster University in Hamilton, Ontario, and University of Limerick (Ireland).

David Parnas received a number of awards and honors:

- ACM "Best Paper" Award, 1979
- Norbert Wiener Award for Social and Professional Responsibility, 1987
- Two "Most Influential Paper" awards International Conference on Software Engineering, 1991 and 1995
- Doctor honoris causa of the Computer Science Department, ETH Zurich, Switzerland, 1986
- Fellow of the Royal Society of Canada, 1992
- Fellow of the Association for Computing Machinery, 1994
- Doctor honoris causa of the Louvain School of Engineering, University of Louvain (UCLouvain), Belgium, 1996
- ACM SIGSOFT's "Outstanding Research" award, 1998
- IEEE Computer Society Harlan Mills Award, 1999
- IEEE Computer Society's 60th Anniversary Award, 2007
- Doctor honoris causa of the Faculty of Informatics, University of Lugano, Switzerland, 2008
- Fellow of the Gesellschaft für Informatik, 2008
- Fellow of the Institute of Electrical and Electronics Engineers (IEEE), 2009
- Doctor honoris causa of the Vienna University of Technology (Dr. Tech.H.C.), Vienna Austria, 2011

== Work ==
=== Modular design ===
In modular design, his double dictum of high cohesion within modules and loose coupling between modules is fundamental to modular design in software. However, in Parnas's seminal 1972 paper On the Criteria to Be Used in Decomposing Systems into Modules, this dictum is expressed in terms of information hiding, and the terms cohesion and coupling are not used.

=== Technical activism ===
Dr Parnas took a public stand against the US Strategic Defense Initiative (also known as "Star Wars") in the mid 1980s, arguing that it would be impossible to write an application of sufficient quality that it could be trusted to prevent a nuclear attack. He has also been in the forefront of those urging the professionalization of "software engineering" (a term that he characterizes as "an unconsummated marriage"). Dr. Parnas is also a heavy promoter of ethics in the field of software engineering.

=== Stance on academic evaluation methods ===
Parnas has joined the group of scientists which openly criticize the number-of-publications-based approach towards ranking academic production. On his November 2007 paper Stop the Numbers Game, he elaborates on several reasons on why the current number-based academic evaluation system used in many fields by universities all over the world (be it either oriented to the amount of publications or the amount of quotations each of those get) is flawed and, instead of contributing to scientific progress, it leads to knowledge stagnation.

== Bibliography ==
- Parnas, D.L. (December 1972). "On the Criteria To Be Used in Decomposing Systems into Modules". Communications of the ACM. 15 (12): 1053–58. doi:10.1145/361598.361623. S2CID 53856438.

== See also ==
- Automatic programming
