= Riwaq (organization) =

Palestinian architectural heritage organization

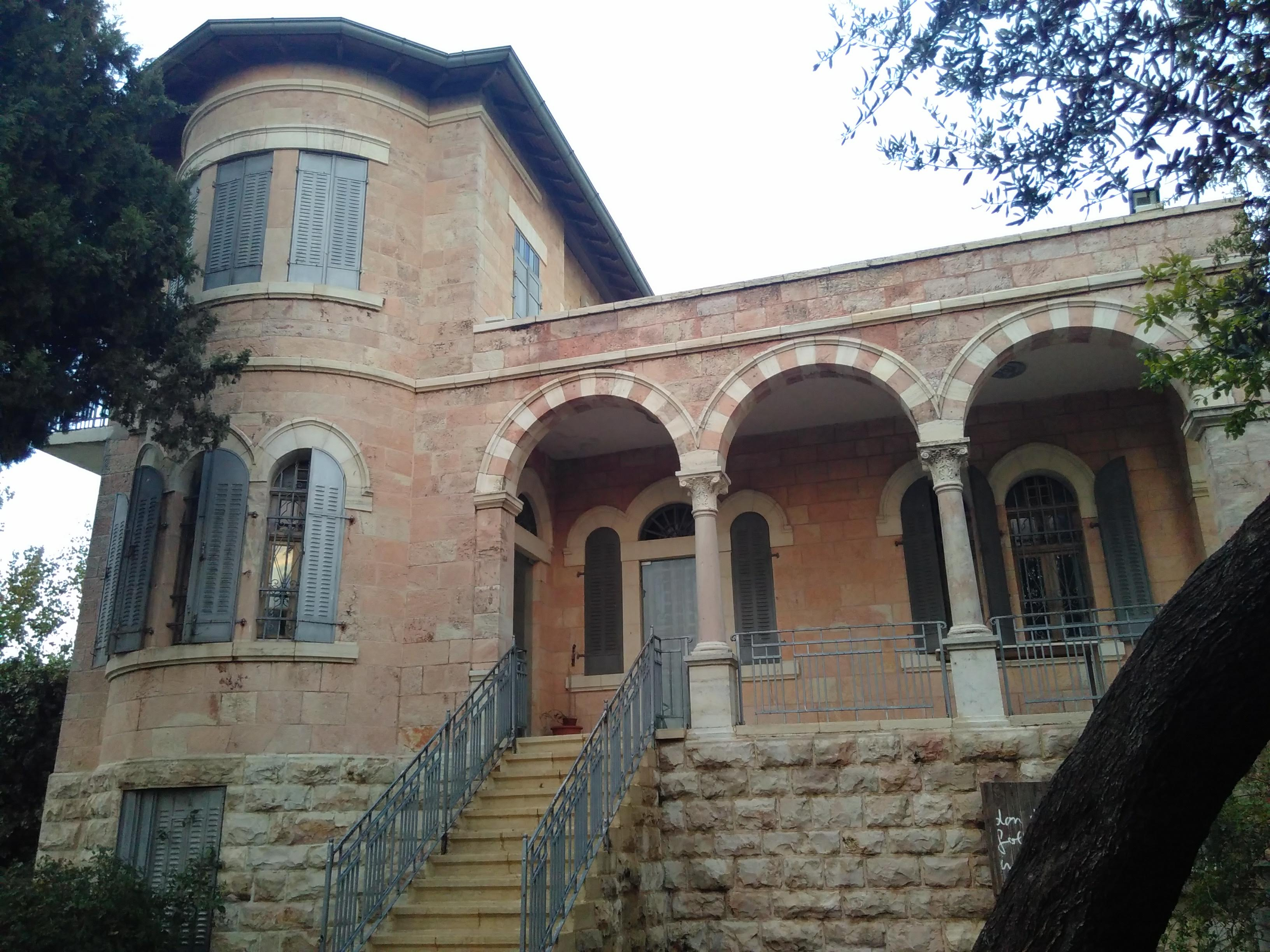
- Founder: Suad Amiry
- Established: 1991
- Mission: Preservation of cultural heritage
- Location: Ramallah, Palestine
- Website: https://www.riwaq.org/

Riwaq (Arabic: رواق) or Centre for Architectural Conservation is a center for the preservation of architectural heritage of rural Palestine. The organization is based in Ramallah and owes its name mainly to a riwaq, which is an arcade in Islamic architecture.

Riwaq was founded by Suad Amiry in 1991 amongst a group of architects, archeologists, and planners with the aim to preserve cultural heritage. Researchers of the center have compiled a detailed register of historic buildings in Palestine. The buildings that they document are frequently threatened by military occupation and counter actions of inhabitants. In the course of twenty years since its foundation, Riwaq had completed more than one hundred restoration projects, including major monuments in the Old City of Jerusalem and the renovation of historic streets in the historical part of Bethlehem.

Riwaq's anti-monumentalist approach to preservation is meant to emphasize the presence of indigenous cultures with vernacular architecture and the shaping of the Palestinian landscape by the hands of average inhabitants. The organization uses a combination of research and documentation, traditional knowledge preservation, restoration, an outreach through cultural programing.

== Initiatives ==
According to Birzeit University lecturer Lana Judeh, "Riwaq has worked since 1991 on the conservation and revitalization of what remains of the rural architectural heritage of historic Palestine, most of which currently lies in the West Bank and Gaza."

The first project of the organization was to conduct a comprehensive architectural survey of Palestinian architecture. Over the course of a decade, hundreds of architects and architecture students documented more than 50,320 buildings in 122 village, towns, and cities. In 2006, they published Riwaq's Registry of Historic Buildings. This effort led to the 50 Villages or 50 Historic Centers Project, when it became clear that over 50% of the historic structures are in 50 Palestinian villages.

=== The 50 Historic Centers Project ===
The project aims to make qualitative addition on the regional scale by empowering communities by offering means to improve their environment and living conditions. Notably, Riwaq has focused on restoring historic buildings within the 50 selected villages to provide community and cultural centers for marginalized groups.

=== Legal framework ===
The first legal framework to protect Palestinian cultural heritage from 1929, developed during the British Mandate, was adopted by the Israeli administration and the Palestinian Authority and has remained relatively unchanged since 1966. In 2004, Riwaq and the Institute of Law at Birzeit University were awarded a tender to draft a new law. As Chiara de Cesari writes, Palestinian heritage work in the post-Oslo period has become a crucial player in the absence of a Palestinian state.

=== Biennale ===
The first Biennale was held in 2005.

== Awards ==
Riwaq was awarded several times:

- 2006: Dubai International Award For the Best Practices to Improve the Living Environment
- 2007: Good Governance Certificate, of Transparency Palestine - The AMAN Coalition, Ramallah
- 2007: Qattan Distinction Award, of A. M. Qattan Foundation's Culture & Arts Programme, Ramallah
- 2010: Palestine International Award for Excellence and Creativity
- 2011: Prince Claus Award
- 2012: Curry Stone Design Prize
- 2013: Aga Khan Award for Architecture
- 2014: Holcim Awards Africa Middle East

== See also ==
- Suad Amiry
