= The Secret Island of Dr. Quandary =

1992 educational video game

- Developer: MECC
- Platforms: MS-DOS, Mac
- Release: WW: 1992
- Genre: Educational
- Mode: Single-player

The Secret Island of Dr. Quandary is an educational puzzle video game developed by MECC, which pits the player against a variety of mathematical and logical puzzles. It was released in 1992 for MS-DOS and Macintosh.

== Plot ==
The player starts as a human playing in a shooting gallery in Dr. Quandary's carnival, and is given a lifelike action figure when the shooting game is defeated. Dr. Quandary, however, puts the player's mind into the doll's body and transports them to his secret island, where the player must gather and brew the Fixer Elixir in order to escape.

== Gameplay ==
There are a variety of puzzles in the game, most requiring some mathematical or logic skills, with some memory challenges thrown in as well. There are also varieties of traditional puzzles, such as Tangrams, Bulls and Cows, Taxman, the Tower of Hanoi, and Nim. Beating each puzzle nets the player an ingredient for the Fixer Elixir, the recipe of which can be a puzzle in itself for the harder difficulty levels.
