= Antonia Stone =

American educator (1930–2002)

Antonia "Toni" Stone
- Born: Antonia Halsted Cushing; 1930
- Died: November 21, 2002 (aged 72); Watertown, Massachusetts, U.S.
- Education: Sarah Lawrence College
- Mother: Mary Watkins Cushing

Antonia "Toni" Stone (born Antonia Halsted Cushing; 1930 – November 21, 2002) was an educator and pioneering activist against the growing digital divide who created the United States' first community technology center. After 20 years as a mathematics teacher in New York City private schools, Stone changed her focus to technology education for poor communities and formerly incarcerated adults.

== Early life and education ==
Stone was the daughter of music critics Mary Watkins Cushing and Edward T. F. Cushing, and grew up in New Canaan, Connecticut. In 1952, she earned a degree from Sarah Lawrence College.

== Educator career ==
Stone began her efforts to bridge the burgeoning digital divide between the rich and poor through her collaboration with the Fortune Society, an inmate advocacy group, to instruct former prisoners on how to use computers. In 1980, Toni Stone set up Playing to Win (PTW), a nonprofit organization dedicated to countering inequities in computer access. PTW looked to serve inmates and ex-offenders by teaching them computer skills and offering technical assistance to prisons and rehabilitation agencies. In 1983, Stone and PTW Corporation opened the Harlem Community Computing Center. This center was located in the basement of a Harlem housing project it provided the neighborhood with public access to personal computers. Taking advantage of the success of PTW, Stone created a network of centers known as the PTWNet.

Playing to Win Network went on to form alliances with six other technology access programs in Harlem, some parts of Boston, Washington, D.C., and Pittsburgh, by 1990. In 1992, Playing To Win was given a three-year grant from the National Science Foundation in order to provide neighborhood technology access to the northeastern United States. Three years later Stone changed the PTWNet name to the Community Technology Centers’ Network (CTCNet). CTCNet led the movement for the adoption of community technology centers (CTCs), with over 1,000 centers established through the U.S. by the early 21st century.

Today, the CTCNet includes more than 600 member sites connected by the Internet. CTCNet is still working to provide computer literacy programs in Harlem. CTCs went on to be federally funded by the National Science Foundation, the Department of Education, and the National Telecommunications and Information Administration (NTIA). Additionally, they were privately funded by the Benton Foundation and AOL-Time Warner.

In 1997, Stone left CTCNet but continued working and advising in the area of technical literacy. Stone received the Norbert Wiener Award from Computer Professionals for Social Responsibility in 1994 and the Eugene L. Lawler Award from the Association for Computing Machinery in 1999 for her work in humanitarian application of computers. In 2001, Stone was awarded an honorary doctorate from DePaul University. Stone also received the Lifetime Achievement Award from the Harvard chapter of Women in Technology.

== Death ==
Antonia Stone died in 2002 due to complications from myelodysplastic leukemia.
