= FrontlineSMS =

- Developer: Ken Banks
- Stable release: 2.0.2
- Written in: Java
- Platform: Cross-Platform (Linux, Microsoft Windows, macOS)
- Type: SMS
- License: LGPL
- Website: www.frontlinesms.com (no longer available, as the service shutdown in 2021)

FrontlineSMS was a free open source software used by a variety of organizations to distribute and collect information via text messaging (SMS). The software worked without an internet connection and with a cell phone and computer.

== History ==
The software was originally developed in 2005 by Ken Banks for conservationists to keep in touch with communities in Kruger National Park in South Africa. The 2.0 release was a deep redesign and was the first version to install a browser-based interface to the Java FrontlineSMS backend.

The website announced end of life for Frontline SMS on their website on 28 June 2021, and the servers shutdown on 31 August 2021.

== Usage ==
FrontlineSMS enabled users to connect a range of mobile devices to a computer to send and receive SMS text messages. The software worked without an internet connection by connecting a device such as a cell phone or GSM modem with a local phone number. FrontlineSMS could send and receive messages, group contacts, respond to messages, and trigger other events. If internet access was available, FrontlineSMS could be connected to online SMS services and set up to feed incoming messages to other web or e-mail services. FrontlineSMS included different features which enable messages to be filtered by keyword, or allowed the submission of Java-based forms with FrontlineSMS Forms.

It had been used to monitor national elections in the Philippines, Afghanistan and Nigeria. For example, in April 2007 it was used by the Network of Mobile Election Monitors (NMEM) to oversee the 2007 Nigerian general election. Volunteers with mobile phones sent back reports from election booths to a central hub in an effort to prevent vote rigging. A similar system was deployed to monitor the 2009 Afghan presidential election, where it was combined with the crisis-mapping tool Ushahidi, to plot the reports on an online map.

After the 2010 Haiti earthquake, FrontlineSMS team members helped establish the 4636 Short Code through other related organizations (Ushahidi, InSTEDD) to allow people on the ground to report emergency information.

FrontlineSMS and its sister organizations were also improving the provision of healthcare in developing countries, where bad roads, long distances, and a shortage of healthcare workers make delivering care difficult. FrontlineSMS:Medic uses the FrontlineSMS software to gather health data and assist in patient follow-up. Community health workers use FrontlineSMS:Medic to transmit information about symptoms and follow up with patients much more quickly and efficiently (by sending a text message rather than driving long distances over bad roads). When FrontlineSMS:Medic was first introduced in one area of Malawi, the local hospital doubled the number of tuberculosis patients treated over six months, while saving 2,100 hours in travel and work time and $3,500 in costs. The tool is now being used in 11 countries, mostly in sub Saharan Africa. In June 2010, FrontlineSMS:Medic team released a public beta of PatientView, which allows hospitals to manage patient information in rural settings where there is no Internet access. The FrontlineSMS:Medic team is also working on a monitoring system to capture symptoms across different languages and spellings and detect disease hotspots, and are working with a researcher at the University of California, Los Angeles to develop an addition that would allow remote diagnosis of malaria and some sexually transmitted diseases, including potentially HIV.

== License ==
FrontlineSMS is licensed under the LGPL. The licensing is defined on the software's SourceForge page.
