= List of dance critics =

This is a list of dance critics.

== List ==
- Alan M. Kriegsman
- Alastair Macaulay – The New York Times
- Andre Levinson
- Andrea Amort
- Anna Kisselgoff
- Arlene Croce
- Bernard H. Haggin
- Carl Van Vechten
- Claudia La Rocco
- Clement Crisp
- Clive Barnes
- David Dougill
- Deborah Jowitt – The Village Voice
- Debra Craine
- Donald Hutera
- Doris Hering
- Edwin Denby
- Elizabeth Zimmer
- George Dorris – Dance Chronicle
- George S Paul
- Gia Kourlas
- Faye Arthurs - Fjord Review
- Holly Brubach
- H.T. Parker
- Jack Anderson (dance critic) – The New York Times
- Jann Parry – The Observer
- Jennifer Dunning
- Jennifer Homans
- Jill Johnston
- Joan Acocella – The New Yorker
- John Martin
- John Rockwell– The New York Times
- John Weaver
- Judith Mackrell – The Guardian
- Laura Jacobs – The New Criterion
- Leigh Witchel
- Luke Jennings – The Observer
- Marcia B. Siegel
- Marina Harss - Fjord Review
- Mary Clarke (dance critic)
- Margaret Lloyd
- Mary F. Watkins
- Maude Lloyd
- Michael Seaver – The Irish Times
- Rachel Howard -- The San Francisco Chronicle
- Robert Gottlieb – The New York Observer
- Robert Greskovic
- Roland Robinson (poet)
- Roslyn Sulcas
- Sanjoy Roy
- Sarah Kaufman (critic) – The Washington Post
- Stephanie Jordan
- Subbudu
- Sunil Kothari
- Théophile Gautier
- Tobi Tobias
- Walter Terry
- Yukihiko Yoshida

== See also ==
- List of dance personalities
