= Maud Allan =

Canadian dancer and choreographer (1873–1956)

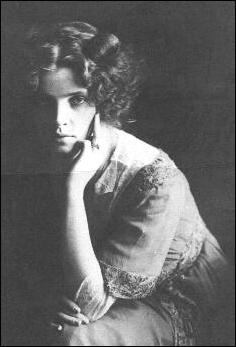
- Born: Beulah Maude Durrant or Ulah Maud Alma Durrant; 27 August 1873; Toronto, Ontario, Canada
- Died: 7 October 1956 (aged 83); Los Angeles, California, U.S.
- Known for: Dance and choreography
- Movement: Modern/contemporary dance

Maud Allan (born Ulla Maude Durrant, (Note: Allan's birth certificate records her name as Ulla Maude Durrant. Her birth name has frequently been incorrectly recorded, including as Ullah Maud Durrant, Ulah Maud Allan Durrant, and Ulla Maude Alma Durrant. Her first name is also sometimes recorded as Beulah, perhaps a mishearing of "Ulla".) 27 August 1873 – 7 October 1956) was a Canadian dancer, chiefly noted for her dance scene Vision of Salome (inspired by Oscar Wilde's play Salome), in which she garnered great attention by performing topless. During World War I, she sued the British MP Noel Pemberton Billing for libel after he alleged that she was a lesbian and that German agents were using her sexual orientation as grounds to blackmail her into spying on the British government. Her lawsuit was unsuccessful. The trial also resurrected public disapproval of Oscar Wilde, whose own failed libel suit had led to his arrest, conviction and imprisonment for gross indecency two decades earlier.

== Early life ==
Maud Allan was born Ulla Maude Durrant in Toronto, Canada, in 1873 to William Allan Durrant and Isabella (Hutchinson) Durrant. Allan was the second of two children, after her older brother, Theodore Durrant. As a young person, Allan loved piano and was very musically gifted. Her teacher was Miss Lichenstein, a well-known piano teacher in Toronto and Montreal at the time.

In 1887, she and her mother and brother moved to San Francisco, California, to meet their father who had lived there for three years before, establishing a life for the family. Theo and Maud attended Abraham Lincoln High School and then the Cogswell Technical Institute where she took courses in wood carving and sculpture. During this time Allan was still practicing and teaching piano. She also gave concerts in the homes of affluent people living in San Francisco including Adolph Sutro. Sutro was rumored to be her grandfather and her mother's biological father; there is sufficient evidence to assume this to be true as the family had little money, yet they were able to send Theo to private boarding school and afford a home in an affluent neighbourhood in San Francisco owned by Sutro.

Her family was actively engaged in the Emmanuel Baptist Church; specifically her brother Theo was the Assistant Superintendent of the church's Sunday school. Her brother was also enrolled in medical school at Cooper Medical College. Allan's piano teacher, Eugene S. Bonelli, founder and director of the San Francisco Grand Conservatory of Music, recommended that she continue her studies in Berlin, Germany at the Hochschule fur Musik.

Even though her family was financially strained, her mother pushed for her to go to Europe to continue her education. Isabella and Theo also planned on meeting her in Germany and travelling around Europe with her after Theo's graduation from medical school. Theo planned to pursue postgraduate medical studies while in Europe.

Only six weeks after Allan went to pursue her career in Germany, her brother committed what was known as the crime of the century. Theodore was charged and convicted of the murders of two young women at Emmanuel Baptist Church. Allan was unable to say a final farewell to her brother, because he was hanged on 7 January 1898, at San Quentin Prison while she was still living in Berlin. Allan blamed herself for her brother's death because she believed if she hadn't left him, he wouldn't have committed the murders. She always maintained that her brother was innocent, and he died unnecessarily. His death stayed with Allan for many years after, and she and her mother Isabella scattered his ashes around Europe to mourn his loss. There is speculation that her last name was changed to Allan to distance herself from her brother's actions and allow her to have a successful career.

== Stage and dance career ==
Allan began her dance career after meeting Ferruccio Busoni, the director of the Meister-schüle in Weimar, Germany, where she studied piano after she finished studying in Berlin. Allegedly, the first time Allan danced was in front of Busoni, who was enthralled with the performance and advised her to stop pursuing piano and change to dance. One of Busoni's contemporaries, Marcel Remy, became her agent and manager, and composed music for her to dance to.

She made her stage debut in Vienna, Austria on 24 November 1903, at the age of 30. She danced to Mendelssohn, Beethoven, Bach, Schumann, Chopin, Schubert, and Debussy. Allan toured this performance in Europe, including Liège, Brussels, Berlin, Leipzig, and Cologne, over the next 5 years.

The piece that gained Allan the most recognition in Europe was The Vision of Salome, which premiered in Vienna in December 1906. This show was inspired by Oscar Wilde's play Salome, which she first saw with Marcel Remy in 1904.

Wilde's play is centered around Salome, King Herod's stepdaughter, and her attraction to Jokanaan (John the Baptist) who has been imprisoned by her stepfather. After Jokanaan rejects her advances because she is a "daughter of Sodom", she dances the Dance of the Seven Veils for her stepfather in exchange for anything she wants. After dancing, she asks for Jokanaan's head. Despite her father's resistance, she gets what she wants and Jokanaan dies.

Allan thought that the lead role could have been better expressed through a different medium, and this is how she got her idea for The Vision of Salome. Remy also created the score for the performance.

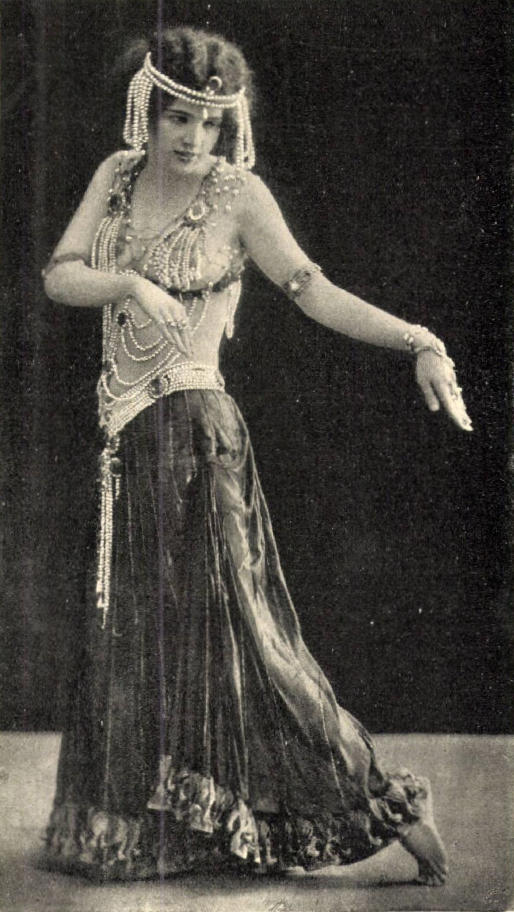
Maud Allan performing as Salome at Király Színház, Budapest

Reviews were generally critical of her dancing, saying that not much of it added to the existing culture that Isadora Duncan had created. It was evident that Allan was not a formally trained dancer from reading the reviews of The Vision of Salome. However, the shock value of the twenty-minute performance intrigued viewers. Allan danced topless; her body was only covered by intricate jewellery. She made the decision to dance topless because she believed that her body was her instrument, and no other artists cover their instruments while they created. Also, a realistic wax sculpted head of John the Baptist sat at the corner of the stage for much of the performance, often terrifying viewers. Allan also used the severed head as a prop towards the end of the performance, and this received attention in the media for being gruesome and absurd. This media attention allowed the news of Allan's performance to travel across Europe and for her to tour places across Europe including Paris, Prague, Budapest, Munich, and Leipzig.

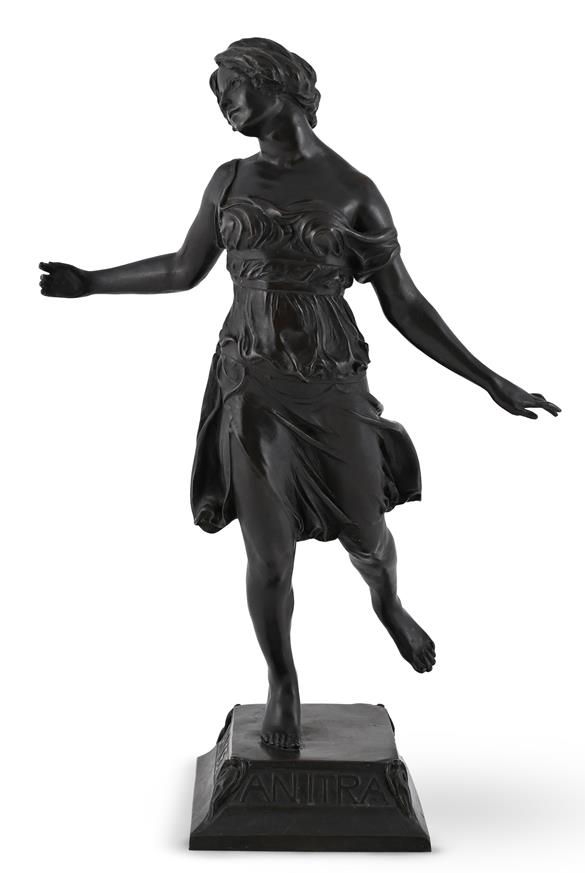
Edith Maryon's February 1909 work The Dance of Anitra, depicting Allan

Allan's next significant career move came when she performed The Vision of Salome in London in 1908 where the depiction of biblical characters on stage was illegal. She began this "conquest of London" by performing a two-week residency at the Palace Theatre where her performance ended with The Vision of Salome. These performances made her an overnight sensation in the region. She continued performing in London for 18 months and performed The Vision of Salome 250 times.

In 1909, Allan decided that Moscow and St. Petersburg, Russia were her next targets. Many reviews unfavourably compared her to Isadora Duncan and criticized her lack of poise in comparison to Duncan's work. The reviews highlighted her passion and efforts, but the Russian audience craved more professionalism and cleanness in movement. Some of her most notable guests were the Czar and Czarina of Russia.

The following year, Allan began touring the United States in Boston. Another dancer, Gertrude Hoffman, had been sent to study Allan's show in London and perform it in New York six weeks before Allan arrived to tour in the states. Many theatres had banned Allan's Vision of Salome performance before she travelled to the United States because of Hoffman's performance. This ended up working in favour of Allan because it made people wonder why a performance was being banned, thus increasing attendance at the shows she was allowed to perform. The New York Times dubbed this intrigue "Salomania", and Allan became a star. Her tour travelled to New York City, Chicago, Philadelphia, Washington, Milwaukee, Cincinnati, Kansas City, San Francisco, Oakland, Los Angeles, Atlanta, Sacramento, Stockton, San Jose, Rochester, and San Diego.

In 1911, after Allan had returned from her tour in the United States and was performing in London again, she approached Debussy with a commission to compose music for a new show she was developing called Khamma, intended to replace The Vision of Salome in her act. The music was never completed and the proposed show was never performed. The story focuses on an Egyptian dancing girl, Khamma, who gave herself as a sacrifice to the god Amun-Re. Khamma was intended to be much more ambitious than The Vision of Salome; Allan wanted to include other dancers, a full orchestra, and possibly singers.

Between 1912 and 1915 she travelled to South Africa, India, the Far East, and Australasia performing numbers in her existing repertoire. Her performances were generally well received by audiences and critics, but the stark cultural differences and religious intolerance for indecency caused some outroar in the press.

At the end of 1915 she returned to the United States to stay with her parents who were living in Los Angeles. It was here that she appeared in the silent movie The Rug Maker's Daughter, where she performed excerpts of The Vision of Salome on screen. She began another North American tour in 1916, which was a failure. She appointed her friend and manager Charles Macmillen as the head of the Maud Allan Concert Agency in New York to manage it, and hired an orchestra and a group of dancers to make it much more elaborate than the previous one. The tour, which began on 28 September 1916 in Albany and made its way into Canada, collapsed due to lack of funds, and was ended in April 1917 by travelling to New York and performing at the Palace Theatre for two weeks. The second week featured the Vision of Salome, which was critically dismissed and never performed again.

== Libel suit and later years ==
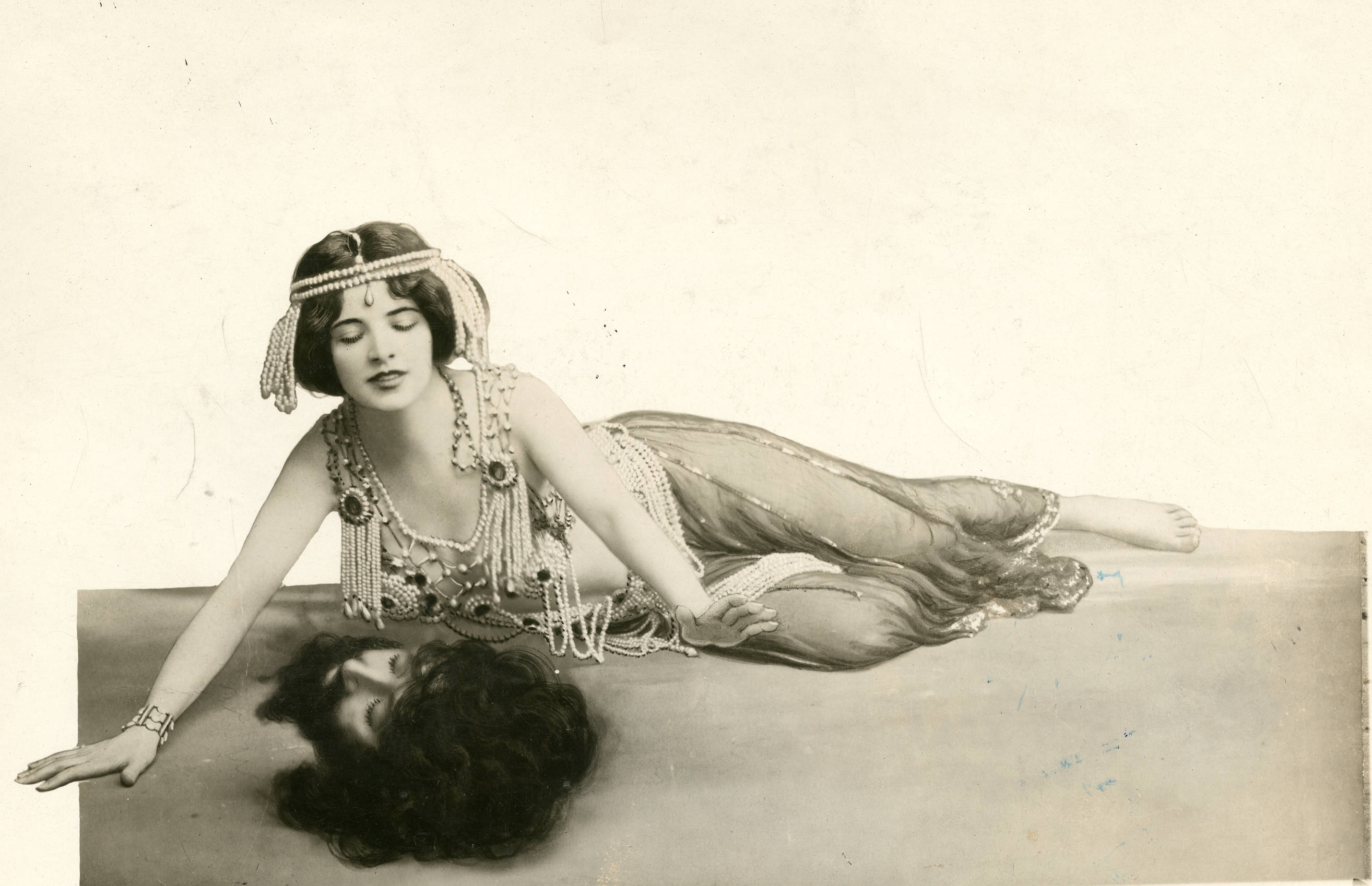
Maud Allan performing as Salome

She returned to London in 1918 and took the lead role of Salome in Jack Grien's production of Oscar Wilde's Salome. Grien's rendition of the play was not a public performance and required patrons to apply to attend the performance to get around the law that Biblical characters could not be portrayed in art. This performance prompted British MP Noel Pemberton Billing to publish an article called "The Cult of the Clitoris" in his own journal Vigilante. The article accused Allan of being a lesbian associate of German wartime conspirators.

Even though same-sex relationships between women were never illegal in England, they were considered to be deplorable throughout society. Billing speculated that many attendees in the "Black Book", where the names of applicants were recorded, were homosexuals who occupied positions of high status in society. He believed that people who were included in this book were being blackmailed by the German government for being gay, and they were gathering information about British high society in exchange for Germans keeping their sexuality secret.

Allan sued Billing for libel based on the following: the act of publishing a defamatory article about Allan and Grien, and the act of including obscenities within the article. The trial became a national news story and lasted five to six days. Billing represented himself and called on high-profile defence witnesses, including Eileen Villiers-Stewart, who was his mistress. He also introduced evidence of Allan's insanity through exhibits highlighting her brother Theo's murder trial and subsequent execution. He justified that by suggesting that Allan's insanity was hereditary. Allan stated that she knew little about Salome, but thought that Oscar Wilde was a great artist. The judge was not concerned with the libel suit as much as he was concerned with how Wilde's play ended up being performed in the first place. The jury found Billing not guilty. The case caused intense public scrutiny of the play, Oscar Wilde, and Maud Allan herself. The trial, and the public outcry against Allan, contributed, among other factors, to the demise of her career in Europe.

After the trial, she returned to America to be with her mother, Isabella Durrant, following the death of her father. She decided to tour South America in 1920 and take her mother along. Over the next decade, she performed in London, Brussels, Paris, San Francisco, and Los Angeles a few more times, with few notable press references. She moved her mother to London in 1928 and spent the next two years with her until her mother died in 1930. After her mother's death, Allan established the West Wing School of Dancing where she taught dance to underprivileged children in London, as well as other private pupils. The school eventually ran into financial troubles due to a lack of funding.

In 1936, she performed publicly for the last time in Los Angeles at the Redlands Community Music Association. In 1942, she abandoned the West Wing School of Dancing after it sustained bomb damage during the Second World War. She became a volunteer ambulance driver for the Red Cross. The following year, Allan relocated to Los Angeles and spent 13 years working as a draughtswoman at McDonnell Aircraft in Santa Monica. On 7 October 1956, she died in a nursing home.

== Relationships with women ==
Allan never disclosed her sexual orientation due to societal norms, but there is sufficient evidence to conclude that she was involved with women throughout her life, most notably Margot Asquith and Verna Aldrich. Asquith was married to Herbert Henry Asquith, who was Prime Minister of the United Kingdom from 1908 to 1916. Margot Asquith paid for Allan's apartment overlooking Regent's Park for twenty years from 1910 onward. Her relationship with Allan solidified the view of many upper-class socialites in London that she was sexually divergent. After Herbert's death in 1928, Margot stopped paying for Allan's apartment and Allan began an affair with her secretary, Aldrich.

Aldrich was Allan's secretary when she was working in London at the West Wing School of Dance, and she lived with Allan for ten years at her Regent's Park apartment. Aldrich was twenty years younger than Allan which allowed Allan to emotionally abuse Aldrich with her demands and paranoia. In 1930, Aldrich received a marriage proposal from a widowed man which led to Allan throwing a tantrum, threatening to expose Aldrich as a lesbian and then commit suicide. Additionally, after Asquith stopped paying for Allan's apartment, Allan got Aldrich to pay the lease while they lived together. After Aldrich's money ran out as a result of her independently financing Allan and herself, Allan searched out Aldrich's wealthy relatives to fund her. Their relationship formally ended when Allan accused Aldrich of stealing from her and threatened to sue. Allan lived in the apartment until it was bombed in the Blitz.

== Bibliography ==
- Cherniavsky, Felix (1983a). "Maud Allan Part I: The Early Years, 1873–1903". Dance Chronicle. 6 (1). New York: Marcel Dekker, Inc.: 1–36. ISSN 0147-2526. JSTOR 1567571.
- Cherniavsky, Felix (1983b). "Maud Allan, Part II: First Steps to a Dancing Career, 1904–1907". Dance Chronicle. 6 (3). New York: Marcel Dekker, Inc.: 189–227. ISSN 0147-2526. JSTOR 1567623.
- Cherniavsky, Felix (1984). "Maud Allan, Part III: Two Years of Triumph 1908–1909". Dance Chronicle. 7 (2). New York: Marcel Dekker, Inc.: 119–158. ISSN 0147-2526. JSTOR 1567629.
- Cherniavsky, Felix (1985). "Maud Allan, Part IV: The Years of Touring, 1910–1915". Dance Chronicle. 8 (1/2). New York: Marcel Dekker, Inc.: 1–50. ISSN 0147-2526. JSTOR 1567563.
- Cherniavsky, Felix (1986). "Maud Allan, Part V: The Years of Decline, 1915–1956". Dance Chronicle. 9 (2). New York: Marcel Dekker, Inc.: 177–236. ISSN 0147-2526. JSTOR 1567554.
- Cherniavsky, Felix (1991). The Salome Dancer: The Life and Times of Maud Allan. Toronto: McClelland & Stewart Inc. ISBN 0-7710-1957-2.
- Cherniavsky, Felix (1998). Maud Allan and Her Art. Toronto: Dance Collection Danse Press. ISBN 0-929003-35-7.
- McConnell, Virginia A. (2005). Sympathy for the Devil: The Emmanuel Baptist Murders of Old San Francisco. Lincoln: University of Nebraska Press. ISBN 978-0-8032-8310-7.
- McDearmon, Lacy (1978). "Maud Allan: The Public Record". Dance Chronicle. 2 (2). New York: Marcel Dekker, Inc.: 85–105. ISSN 0147-2526. JSTOR 1567472.
- Pritchard, Jane (14 June 2018). "Allan, Maud [real name Ulla Maude Durrant] (1873–1956), dancer". Oxford Dictionary of National Biography (online ed.). Oxford University Press. doi:10.1093/odnb/9780198614128.013.71042. (Subscription, Wikipedia Library access or UK public library membership required.)
