= Doris Hering =

American dance critic (1920–2014)

- Born: April 11, 1920; Brooklyn, New York City, U.S.
- Died: October 15, 2014 (aged 94); The Bronx, New York City, U.S.
- Education: Hunter College; Fordham University
- Occupation: Dance critic

Doris Minnie Hering (April 11, 1920 – October 15, 2014) was an American dance critic. Hering wrote for Dance Magazine throughout her career, which spanned the 1940s through the 2000s, and was especially interested in American dance outside the Northeast. Hering was a founder of the National Association for Regional Ballet, now known as Regional Dance America, which promotes pre-professional dance across the United States.

== Biography ==
Doris Hering was born in Brooklyn, New York on April 11, 1920. As a child, Hering's first experience with dance was at vaudeville shows. She studied Romance languages at Hunter College, but was unable to pursue her desired career as a French teacher. Hering later attended secretarial school and worked for an advertising agency. She developed an interest in dance writing in the early 1940s, recounting later in her life that "my hapless boyfriends were all dragged to dance performances."

Hering began writing for Dance Magazine in the late 1940s, rising to the position of associate editor and principal critic by 1951. In 1957, she was assigned to cover the second annual Southeastern Regional Ballet Festival in Birmingham, Alabama for Dance Magazine. Hering was impressed with the festival, and developed an interest in regional dance that defined the rest of her career.

From her coverage of the Southeastern Regional Ballet Festival, Hering developed a professional relationship with Atlanta-based choreographer Dorothy Alexander, the leader of the Atlanta Civic Ballet. Hering and Alexander co-founded the National Association for Regional Ballet in the early 1970s, coordinating the activities of five regional ballet associations. Hering was awarded the 1985 Capezio Dance Award for her contributions to dance criticism and regional dance. The citation described her as "an articulate voice and tireless fighter for the growth of companies large and small."

Hering completed a master's degree in Romance languages at Fordham University in 1985. She departed the National Association for Regional Ballet in 1987, and returned to freelance writing. In her later life, Hering resumed writing for Dance Magazine and other publications, including the American National Biography and the dance pages of The New York Times. Hering's entries in the American National Biography include those for Nellie Cornish, Jerome Robbins, and E. Virginia Williams.

Hering and May O'Donnell were the co-recipients of the 2002 Martha Hill Prize, awarded by the Juilliard School for lifetime achievement in dance. Hering died on October 15, 2014, in The Bronx.

== Critical perspectives ==
Historian and critic Selma Jeanne Cohen highlighted Hering's critical style in 1965, where Cohen argued that contemporary critics were overly descriptive and technical, and insufficiently analytical. Hering argued in an earlier review that "while lexicography can be an absorbing game, this also means that the choreography is not calling forth a total response." Cohen concurred, placing Hering's criticism as an exception to the then-current field of critics, who Cohen argued were "incapable of a total response to theatrical dance."

Jack Anderson described Hering as "America's finest living still-active dance critic" months before her death in 2014, and praised the direction of Dance Magazine under her editorship, especially its wide geographic reach.

In 2002, Hering criticized what she perceived as the "popularization" of American dance. Hering argued that contemporary dance was overly "short, fast and athletic," a trend that she argued applied to performance, criticism, and education.

== Publications ==
- Hering, Doris, ed. (1951). 25 Years of American Dance. New York: Rudolf Orthwine. OCLC 422275.
- Hering, Doris; Fehl, Fred (1981). Giselle & Albrecht: American Ballet Theatre's Romantic Lovers. New York: Dance Horizons. ISBN 9780871271242.
