= Margaret Lloyd (dance critic) =

American dance critic (1887–1960)

- Born: Margaret Thayer; 1887 South Braintree, Massachusetts
- Died: March 1, 1960 (aged 72) Brookline, Massachusetts
- Occupation: Dance critic
- Notable works: The Borzoi Book of Modern Dance

Margaret Lloyd (née Thayer; 1887 – March 1, 1960) was an American dance critic in the field of modern dance. Lloyd was one of the first full-time modern dance critics for an American newspaper, covering dance for The Christian Science Monitor from 1936 until her death in 1960. Her 1949 review of the field of modern dance, The Borzoi Book of Modern Dance, remains an important work, and has been reprinted into the 21st century. Lloyd lived in Massachusetts her whole life, and covered dance performances across the Northeastern United States.

== Biography ==
Margaret Thayer was born in South Braintree, Massachusetts in 1887. According to her longtime friend Pauline Chellis, she was a descendant of Sylvanus Thayer, and took the name "Margaret Lloyd" as a pen name after a stepfather. Lloyd was a follower of the Christian Science movement, and began writing film reviews and feature stories for The Christian Science Monitor by 1931. Her work expanded to dance in 1936, focusing especially on the rapidly-expanding field of modern dance.

Lloyd wrote a review of the field of early 20th-century modern dance in 1949, The Borzoi Book of Modern Dance. Published by Alfred A. Knopf, it was noted for its pioneering approach. Fellow dance critic John Martin, one of Lloyd's few contemporaries, praised the book for its "scope and authority" while also highlighting a number of small factual errors.

Lloyd continued her work in the field of dance criticism after publishing The Borzoi Book of Modern Dance, writing for the Christian Science Monitor until her death in 1960. Lloyd's final piece was her review of the Roberto Iglesias ballet company at Boston's Symphony Hall for The Monitor, published after her death.

== Context in the field of dance criticism ==
Lloyd was one of the first full-time dance critics writing for major American newspapers, and one of the first to focus on modern dance. Historian Lynne Conner contextualizes dance criticism in major American newspapers with music criticism, which she argues became commonplace in large-city papers in the 1860s, and became more conservative in the late 19th century. Conner highlights a moment of change in reporting on modern dance in 1903, when a report of Isadora Duncan's German performances was transmitted by submarine cable and republished in The New York Times.

Duncan's immense popularity with the American media was still insufficient to create comprehensive coverage of modern dance in American newspapers, with sensationalism and intense skepticism common in reviews of modern dance from the 1910s and 20s. Conner places Henry Taylor Parker and Carl Van Vechten as the first notable critics of American-produced dance, with their coverage from the 1910s focusing on the developing field of American ballet. Following the commercial and popular success of the Denishawn company's performances at Carnegie Hall in 1927, major New York newspapers finally began to appoint full-time critics of modern dance, including Lucile Marsh at the New York World, Mary Fitch Watkins at the New York Herald Tribune, and John Martin at The New York Times.

== Personal life ==
Lloyd married The Monitor's music and theater editor Leslie A. Sloper during her employment at The Monitor. They had three children, and Lloyd also had one child from a previous marriage. Sloper died in 1949.

== Critical perspectives ==
Fellow dance critic Walter Sorell described Lloyd's criticism as personal, story-driven, and authentic. Concurringly, her biographer and peer Doris Hering argues that "In [an] era when writings about dancers tended to treat them as exotic creatures, Lloyd's pragmatic view of her subjects as social beings was a major contribution to the field."

Lloyd covered the major dance festivals of the Northeastern United States, including the Connecticut College School of Dance / American Dance Festival. In her coverage of the ADF, beginning in the mid-1950s, Lloyd argued that the festival had become too stylistically unified around the techniques of José Limón and Doris Humphrey, instead of providing variety.

Choreographer Alwin Nikolais described Lloyd's critical analysis as less formulaic and more contemporary than that of her peers, highlighting his observation of a conversation between Lloyd and four other critics. Nikolais recalls that the four peers each detailed their rules for evaluating a performance, which he believed were outdated. Nikolais claims that Lloyd refuted them, recounting that "she turned to the other four and frankly said, 'I really don't know what you are talking about. I just go and look.'"

Lloyd condemned the presence of left-wing politics in modern dance during the Great Depression. This included the rhetoric of the National Dance Congress, an organization led primarily by left-wing Jewish modern dancers such as Helen Tamiris and Anna Sokolow. The New School history professor Julia Foulkes highlights Lloyd's criticism of the organization's May 1936 meeting, where Lloyd argued that leftist politics would "only succeed in turning the remaining liberals into fascisti." Northwestern University history professor Susan Manning concurred on Lloyd's views on liberalism, arguing that Lloyd's chronology in The Borzoi Book of Modern Dance primarily attributed the success of modern dance to "American ideals of freedom and democracy," which Manning believes "echoed the emerging rhetoric of Cold War liberalism."

Lloyd detailed her opinions on dance criticism in her correspondence with Lewiston Evening Journal reporter Charlotte Michaud in the late 1930s. In one letter written in 1938, Lloyd argued that dance critics should be journalists and not dancers, to maintain a broader view of the field and insulate their coverage from the influence of jealousy.

== Legacy ==
Pearl Lang dedicated Shira, a piece that would become one of her best-known works, to Lloyd's memory. Shira was performed at the American Dance Festival at Connecticut College in the summer of 1960.

Susan Manning places The Borzoi Book of Modern Dance as a core part of a key and well-communicated, if inherently problematic, historiography of modern and postmodern dance. In her 2025 essay "Writing and Rewriting Modern Dance History," Manning argues that The Borzoi Book of Modern Dance forms part of a series of "invaluable documentation on dancemakers and on dances seen in performance." Manning places Lloyd's book in sequence with what she argues are its peer works: John Martin's The Modern Dance (1933) and America Dancing (1936); Don McDonagh's The Rise and Fall of Modern Dance (1970); and Sally Banes' Terpsichore in Sneakers (1980/1987).

== Publications ==
- Lloyd, Margaret (1949). The Borzoi Book of Modern Dance (1st ed.). New York: Alfred A. Knopf. OCLC 1146894.
