= George Dorris =

American historian

George Dorris (born August 3, 1930) is an American dance historian, educator, editor, and writer. As managing editor of Dance Chronicle for thirty years, he laid foundations and established standards for dance scholarship not only in the United States but in many other countries of the world. In 2007, he was honored with a lifetime membership in the Society of Dance History Scholars and by the award for Outstanding Service to Dance Research presented by the Congress on Research in Dance.

== Early life and education ==
George Edward Dorris was born into a prominent family in Eugene, Oregon, the son of Benjamin Fultz Dorris and Klysta (Cornet) Dorris. In 1892, his great-uncle George Dorris purchased a farm in Springfield, about five miles from Eugene, and experimented with various crops before establishing a hazelnut orchard in 1905. The mild weather, abundance of rain, and well-drained soil of the Willamette Valley provided ideal conditions for growing nut trees. Over the next fifty years, the Dorris Ranch, as the farm was known, was expanded as Ben Dorris joined his uncle and developed the property to around seventy-five acres with a nursery and thousands of trees. However, young George Dorris was not interested in a career in the nut industry, being more attracted to languages and literature than to agriculture.

After completing high school in 1948, Dorris studied Spanish and English literature at the University of Oregon in Eugene. He graduated a year early with a Bachelor of Arts degree and then spent a year working in San Francisco. While there, he had opportunities to attend concerts, plays, and opera and ballet performances. Afterward, he enrolled in the graduate school of Northwestern University in Evanston, Illinois, to pursue his studies in Restoration and eighteenth-century English literature. In his second year, he was awarded a university fellowship that paid his tuition and living expenses. Then, in 1955, he received a Fulbright Scholarship to study in Italy. After a few months in Italy, he returned to Northwestern as a graduate assistant in the Department of English. He took his first teaching jobs while finishing his doctoral dissertation on poet, librettist, and translator Paolo Antonio Rolli (1687–1765) and the Italian circle in London. He completed his doctoral degree in 1962, working on the dissertation under the supervision of Jean H. Hagstrum.

== Academic career ==
Before completing his dissertation, Dorris began his professional career as an instructor of English literature at Duke University in North Carolina (1957–1960). He then moved on to Rutgers University in New Jersey (1960–1962), the University of the Pacific and its constituent Raymond College in California (1962–1964), and to Queens College of the City University of New York (1964–1967). The remainder of his teaching career (1967–1998) was spent at York College, also a component of the City University of New York. There, he rose from assistant professor to associate professor of English literature, teaching courses in Restoration and eighteenth-century drama, poetry, and prose, as well as occasional courses in criticism and dance history.

After attending a performance of the New York City Ballet in February 1965, Dorris was fortunate to meet the poet Jack Anderson, who was working at Dance Magazine at the time. Dorris had long been interested in dance, having seen programs presented by the American Ballet Theatre, Ballet Russe de Monte Carlo, the Royal Ballet of London, and the Martha Graham Dance Company. His interest in dance history grew further after meeting Anderson, who, along with their friend George Jackson, also wrote for the English magazine Ballet Today. In his academic field, Dorris had found that there was "not much new to say about John Dryden or Alexander Pope," but he came to realize that "there were enormous areas of dance just waiting to be discovered."

== Avocation as dance historian ==
Following Anderson and Jackson's example, Dorris began writing occasional reviews of dance performances for Ballet Today. At a party in 1966, he met Arlene Croce, who had recently launched Ballet Review magazine. He became one of its early contributors, marking the start of his long and distinguished career as a dance historian. He was encouraged in his endeavors by Selma Jeanne Cohen, a leading figure in dance scholarship, who became his lifelong mentor and friend. In 1967, Dorris served for ten years as music editor for Ballet Review, and, eventually, became the regular reviewer of musical recordings for the publication (1993–present). Additionally, he served as the secretary on the board of directors of Dance Perspectives Foundation from 1975 to 1981. In 1977, Dorris and Anderson were the founding editors of Dance Chronicle: Studies in Dance and Related Arts, a journal published by Marcel Dekker that became the acknowledged leader in the field of dance scholarship. They continued to produce several issues a year—four at first, then three—until 2007, when they relinquished their roles to younger scholars.

During these years, Dorris was also active in several professional organizations focused on dance history and criticism. In 1978, he was a founding member of the Society of Dance History Scholars, for which he served on the board of directors (1979–1983, 1990–1993) and on the editorial board (2001–2004). He also served on the board of directors of the Dance Critics Association (1980–1983, 1996–1999) and the World Dance Alliance (1991–2012) and was a longtime member of the Congress on Research in Dance. He had a significant effect on the policies and direction of all these organizations, helping each one to move forward toward its stated goals.

In 1981, Selma Jeanne Cohen invited Dorris to become an associate editor of the International Encyclopedia of Dance, a major undertaking of the Dance Perspectives Foundation. As the area editor for dance from 1400 to 1800 and for Western music, he worked on the project for many years, until its successful publication in 1998. Soon after, he was invited to become one of a group of principal researchers for Popular Balanchine, a project of the George Balanchine Foundation devoted to documenting Mr. Balanchine's work on Broadway shows and Hollywood films. He completed his research on the operettas Rosalinda (1942) and The Merry Widow (1943) in 2002. In 2005, he collaborated with Frank Andersen, the artistic director of the Royal Danish Ballet, and Danish dance critic Erik Aschengreen in organizing a symposium at the international festival in Copenhagen. The event would celebrate the two-hundredth anniversary of choreographer August Bournonville's birth.

== Selected writings ==
- Paolo Rolli and the Italian Circle in London, 1713-1744. The Hague: Mouton, 1967. The published version of his doctoral dissertation at Northwestern University.
- Numerous articles as music editor, Ballet Review. New York: Ballet Review, 1967–1977.
- "Music for the Ballets of John Weaver." Dance Chronicle 3.1 (1979), 46–60.
- "Massine in 1938: Style and Meaning." In Proceedings of the tenth annual conference of the Society of Dance History Scholars, University of California at Riverside, June 1988, pp. 200–211.
- "The Choreography of Robert Joffrey." Dance Chronicle 12.1 (1989), 105–139, and "A Supplement," 12.3, 383–385.
- Numerous articles as reviewer of recorded music, Ballet Review. New York: Ballet Review, 1993–present.
- "Don Quixote in the Twentieth Century: A Mirror for Choreographers." Choreography and Choreographers, special issue on Dance in Hispanic Culture, 3.4 (1994), pp. 47–53.
- "Leo Staats at the Roxy, 1926-1928." Dance Research (London) 13.1 (1995), 84–99.
- "Bernstein, Leonard," with coauthor Kenneth LaFaye, in International Encyclopedia of Dance, edited by Selma Jenne Cohen and others (New York: Oxford University Press, 1998), vol. 1, pp. 438–439.
- "Jean Börlin as Dancer and Choreographer." Dance Chronicle 22.2 (1999), 167–188.
- "The Choreography of Jean Börlin; A Checklist with the Tours and Personnel of Les Ballets Suedois." Dance Chronicle 22.2 (1999), 189–222.
- The Royal Swedish Ballet, 1773-1998. Edited and introduced by George Dorris. London: Dance Books, 1999.
- "Twenty-five Years of Dance Chronicle." With Jack Anderson as coauthor. Dance Chronicle 25.1 (2002), vii-viii.
- Summary essays on research: Rosalinda (1942) and The Merry Widow (1943, revival 1957), for Popular Balanchine, a project of the George Balanchine Foundation; dossiers submitted in 2002 and deposited in the Jerome Robbins Dance Division of the New York Public Library for the Performing Arts in 2005. See Popular Balanchine, Guide to the Dossiers, at http://balanchine.org/balanchine/03/pc.
- "Aaron Copland (1900-1990)," for America's Irreplaceable Dance Treasures, the First 100. Washington, D.C.: Dance Heritage Coalition, c.2003, published online 2012.
- "The Polish Ballet at the New York World's Fair, June 1939." Dance Chronicle 27.2 (2004), 217–234.
- "Dance and the New York Opera Wars, 1906-1912." Dance Chronicle 32.2 (2005), 195–262.
- "The Metropolitan Opera Ballet, Fresh Starts: Rosina Galli and the Ballets Russes, 1912-1917." Dance Chronicle 35.2 (2012), 173–207.
- "The Metropolitan Opera Ballet, Fresh Starts: Galli in Charge, 1919-1921." Dance Chronicle 36.1 (2013), 77–106.

== Personal life ==
Dorris was married to dance critic Jack Anderson from 2006 until Anderson's death in 2023. They began their relationship in 1965 and traveled widely over the years and have made friends with dance historians in North America, South America, and Europe. They were married in 2006 in the Studio Theater on the campus of York University in Toronto, Canada. On February 12, 2015, in the company of friends and colleagues at their home in Greenwich Village in New York City, they celebrated the fiftieth anniversary of their first meeting and lifetime union.

== See also ==
- Dance critique
- LGBT culture in New York City
- List of LGBT people from New York City
- NYC Pride March
