= Lucile Marsh Murray =

American dance writer and businesswoman (1899–1982)

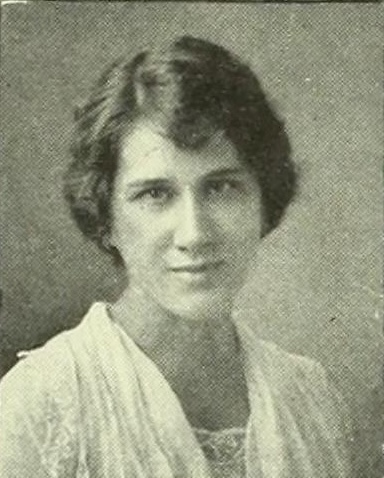
- Barnard College yearbook portrait, c. 1919
- Born: Lucile Marsh; November 13, 1899
- Died: June 15, 1982 (aged 82)
- Occupation: Dancer; dance critic; businesswoman
- Education: Barnard College (BA); Teachers College (MA)
- Subject: Modern dance; physical education
- Spouse: Alan E. Murray (m. 1943; sep. 1965)
- Relatives: Agnes Lewis Marsh (sister)

Lucile Marsh Murray (née Marsh; November 13, 1899 – June 15, 1982) was an American dancer, writer, and businesswoman. Marsh trained as a dancer during the early days of the modern dance movement, and was active in the fields of dance criticism, dance education, and physical education. Marsh was one of the first full-time newspaper dance critics in the United States, writing for the New York World in the late 1920s. In her later life, Marsh was the editor of multiple dance publications and operated a custom shoe manufacturing company.

== Early life and education ==
Lucile Marsh was born on November 13, 1899, and grew up in Bridgeport, Connecticut. She attended high school in Bridgeport, graduating in 1916. Marsh studied dance at Barnard College in New York City, graduating in 1920. Following her graduation from Barnard, Marsh studied Dalcroze eurhythmics for a summer.

In the early 1920s, Marsh formed her dance own company, the Lucile Marsh Concert Dancers. Marsh taught at Smith College in Massachusetts for four years, and co-authored an early textbook on dance education, The Dance in Education, with her sister Agnes in 1924. Marsh returned to New York in the mid-1920s to enroll in graduate studies at Teachers College, which she completed in 1925. Marsh studied under modern dance education pioneer Gertrude Colby, whose interest in progressive education and background in physical education influenced Marsh's later works.

== Dance writing and teaching ==
Marsh regularly taught at the University of Georgia during summers in the 1920s, where her associates included future Atlanta Ballet founder Dorothy Alexander. Marsh's choreography at the University of Georgia was often presented outdoors, and was aesthetically inspired by both the classical architecture of the campus and the natural environment it existed within.

Throughout the mid-1920s, Marsh regularly advocated for New York newspapers to expand their coverage of dance. Marsh wrote regular letters to the editor to the city's newspapers, criticizing what she perceived as biases in newspaper music and dance criticism. Marsh's writing had little effect on the state of newspaper dance coverage until the fall of 1927, when three major New York newspapers appointed dance critics, potentially in response to a successful series of performances by the Denishawn company at Carnegie Hall. Marsh was hired by the New York World, and was a contemporary of John Martin at The New York Times and Mary Fitch Watkins at the New York Herald Tribune.

Marsh began writing a Sunday column on dance for the World in September 1927, which developed into a beat on the city's dance performances. Marsh's writing served as a resource for both the general public and the modern dance community, reflecting her status as both a dancer and a reporter. For the general public, Marsh's reviews offered analysis of the aesthetics and development of the rapidly changing dance landscape in New York. For the dance community, Marsh advocated for better coordination between dance companies, arguing that the then-small number of artists could better coordinate their performance schedules to avoid presenting competing performances on the same dates.

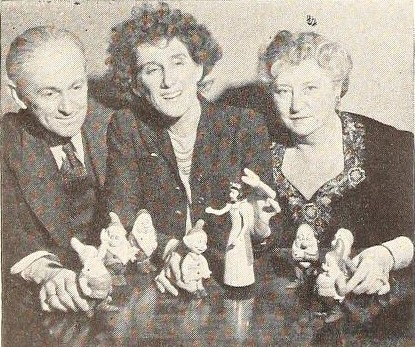
Marsh (center) in a 1944 promotional photo for a re-release of Snow White and the Seven Dwarfs

Marsh was laid off from the World when it merged with the New York Telegram in 1931. The arts coverage of the combined New York World-Telegram was cut back, and Marsh returned to freelance writing. Marsh was the director of the National Dance League in the mid-1930s, an organization which represented prominent figures in American professional dance outside the field of concert dance.

In 1936, Marsh and the National Dance League came into conflict with the Federal Dance Project, a division of the Works Progress Administration's Federal Theatre Project led by modern dancer Helen Tamiris. The National Dance League contended that the FDP employed amateurs in its productions, disadvantaging out-of-work professional dancers such as ballet dancers, ballroom dancers, and chorus girls.

Marsh was the editor of Dance Magazine in the 1940s, and continued writing about dance education, pedagogy, and hygiene. Marsh maintained contacts with the film industry, and regularly worked to promote musical films featuring dance. The National Dance League coordinated with the film industry to publish materials for local dance teachers, allowing them to recreate the choreography from popular films such as Follow the Fleet and Snow White and the Seven Dwarfs.

== Murray Space Shoe and later life ==
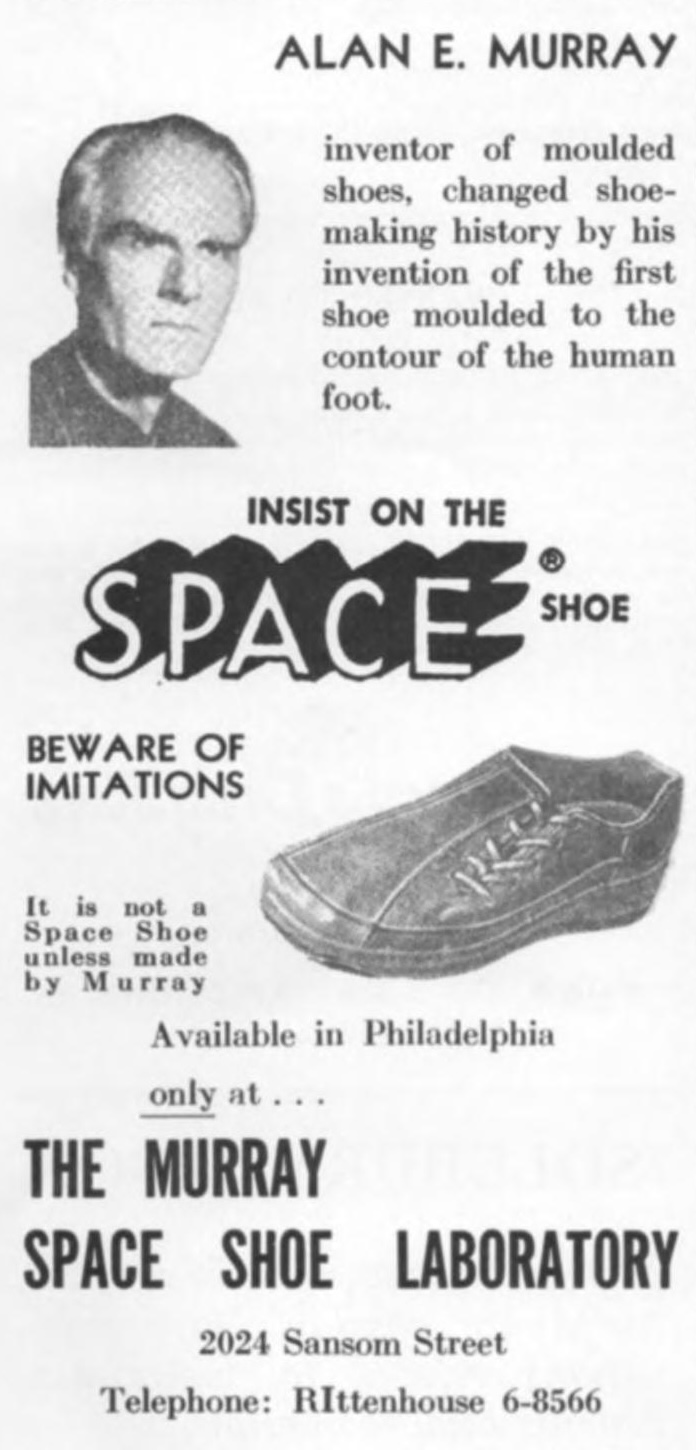
1958 advertisement for a Murray Space Shoe dealer in Philadelphia

Marsh married Alan E. Murray, the inventor of the Murray Space Shoe, in 1943. Murray, a former professional ice skater, developed a concept for an ice skate molded for the wearer's feet in the 1930s. He refined the concept into a brand of custom-molded, side-laced neoprene shoes in a variety of styles, and began selling them commercially in Wilmington, Delaware in 1937. Their business expanded steadily, with a national network of dealers who took molds of customers' feet for manufacturing at a central factory. Marsh wrote the company's advertising copy, promoting the shoes as the cure to numerous ailments.

The Federal Trade Commission sued the company in 1959, alleging that it falsely advertised the health benefits of its products and engaged in anti-competitive practices with its dealers. The suit was settled in 1961, and by 1965 the company's Bridgeport, Connecticut factory had over 40 employees.

Marsh and Murray separated in 1965, following extended divorce proceedings that also included a dispute over control of the company. Both parties continued manufacturing the Space Shoe, Marsh at the Connecticut factory and Murray at a workshop in Long Island City. By 1968, Marsh's version of the Space Shoe was sold by 50 dealers across the country at $75 per pair, equivalent to $694 in 2025. Murray's workshop also continued in operation, and was taken over by his longtime business associate and second wife Anna Veronika Murray after his death in 1978.

Marsh sold her Space Shoe business in 1979 to one of her company's dealers in California. The mother-and-son partnership moved the manufacturing to Mountain View and later to Guinda, California, and was still in business on a limited scale in 2016.

Marsh died on June 15, 1982. Her personal papers are housed at the Jerome Robbins Dance Division of the New York Public Library for the Performing Arts.

== Critical perspectives ==
In her 1924 book The Dance in Education, Marsh and her sister Agnes placed dance in the context of a physical education curriculum. In the introduction to The Dance in Education, the Marshes argued that:

"If dancing is to be a great instrument of education, it must satisfy these requirements: (1) It must aid and maintain bodily growth and development. (2) It must interest the student and offer stimulus to the full extent of his maturity. (3) It must further social adjustment."

Dance historian Thomas K. Hagood argues that Marsh's views on dance and physical education were progressive relative to her peers, writing in 2000 that Marsh's integration of dance as a fine art into physical education curricula "predicts and articulates a central, and thorny, point in the literature for dance for the next 30 years."

During her tenure at the World, Marsh described herself as the most progressive of her peers. Historian Lynne Conner highlights this issue by examining her and her peers Martin and Watkins' responses to Doris Humphrey's Water Study, a groundbreaking concert-length piece performed in silence to the rhythm of the dancers' breath. Conner argues that Marsh's opinion on Water Study was the most favorable of her peers, "consistent with her stance as a proponent and practitioner of contemporary dance."

In the mid-1930s, Marsh's National Dance League expressed strong opinions about the status of dance in the Federal Theatre Project. In June 1936, the National Dance League released a statement alleging that the New York branch of the FTP was "given over to modernistic dancing," arguing that "government funds should not be used to subsidize one small aspect of a field at the expense of all other branches of the profession." Historian Mark Franko argues that this criticism was a clear political statement, writing in 2002 that "the charge of unprofessionalism thinly veiled the graver charge of political radicalism."

== Selected works ==
- Marsh, Lucile; Marsh, Agnes Lewis (1924). The Dance in Education. New York: A. S. Barnes.
- — (April 1929). "The Project Method in Speech Education". Quarterly Journal of Speech. 15 (2): 181–188. doi:10.1080/00335632909360789. ISSN 0033-5630.
- — (October 1932). "The New Dance Era". The Journal of Health and Physical Education. 3 (8): 22–60. doi:10.1080/23267240.1932.10627080. ISSN 2326-7240.
- — (November 1935). "A Survey of the Social Dance in America". The Journal of Health and Physical Education. 6 (9): 34–62. doi:10.1080/23267240.1935.10625734. ISSN 2326-7240.
