= The Rug Maker's Daughter =

1915 film by Oscar Apfel

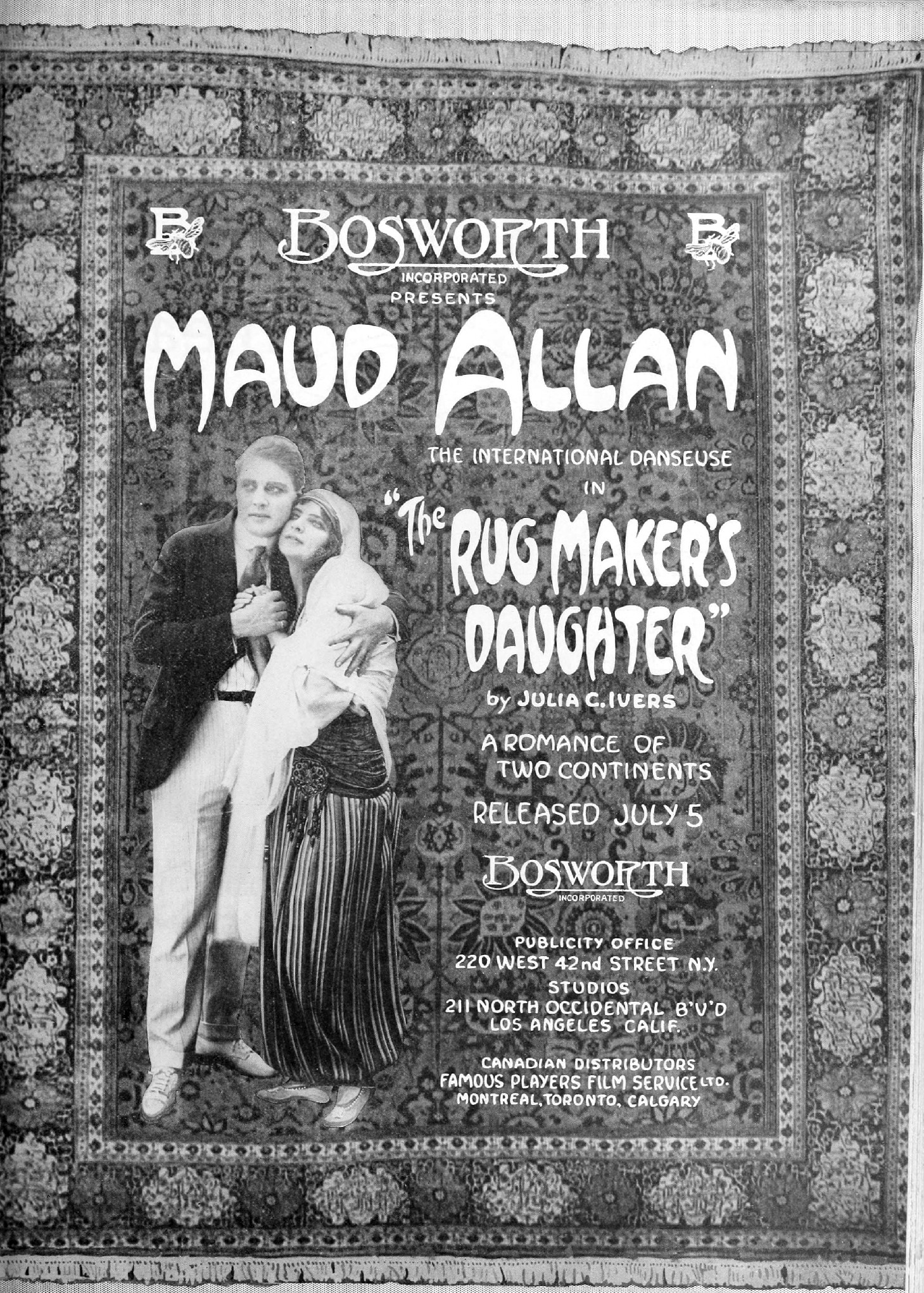
- Advertisement
- Directed by: Oscar Apfel
- Story by: Julia Crawford Ivers
- Produced by: Hobart Bosworth
- Starring: Maud Allan; Forrest Stanley; Jane Darwell; Howard Davies; Herbert Standing; Laura Woods Cushing
- Production companies: Hobart Bosworth Productions; Oliver Morosco Photoplay Company
- Distributed by: Paramount Pictures
- Release date: July 5, 1915
- Running time: 5 reels
- Country: United States
- Language: Silent (English intertitles)

The Rug Maker's Daughter is a 1915 American silent adventure film directed by Oscar Apfel and written by Julia Crawford Ivers. The film stars Maud Allan, Forrest Stanley, Jane Darwell, Howard Davies, Herbert Standing, and Laura Woods Cushing. The film was released on July 5, 1915, by Paramount Pictures. The film featured three of Allan's dances, including an excerpt from her infamous Vision of Salome performance.

== Plot ==
As described in a film magazine, while in Constantinople, Bob Van Buren comes to the rescue when Demetra, an upper-class young Turkish woman, and her duenna are waylaid by robbers, which paves the way for romance between them. This is opposed by her father and Osman, the fiancée her father is attempting to force on her. With the thought of such a highly educated, gifted with the needle, and graceful dancer ending up in a harem instead of a respectful home driving him to desperation, Bob convinces her to elope with him to New York City. Finding out the scheme, Osman has ruffians grab Bob on their eve of departure. With her American vanished, and the day of her odious wedding to Osman approaching, Demetra flees with her duenna on the same boat that passage had been reserved, intending to reach a cousin in New York City. Osman pursues her, and traps her in New York City. He summons a Turkish priest but Bob, having escaped from a dungeon in Constantinople, arrives in time to save Demetra and take her to his mother's home. When Mrs. Van Buren suggests the lovers wait until September to be wed, they instead have their hearts set on a June wedding, it being June.

== Cast ==
- Maud Allan as Demetra
- Forrest Stanley as Robert Van Buren
- Jane Darwell as Mrs. Van Buren
- Howard Davies as Osman
- Herbert Standing as Halib Bey
- Laura Woods Cushing as Barah
- Harrington Gibbs as John Marshall
- Mary Ruby

== Preservation ==
A 436-foot-long fragment of The Rug Maker's Daughter is held at the BFI National Archive.
