= Dance criticism =

Type of review

Dance criticism in the United States is the act of producing a written or spoken review of a dance performance (often ballet, modern dance, or contemporary dance). It may also refer to the report itself, which may act as an archived review, critique, or highlight. As with other topics, dance criticism may employ its own technical language, and may also reflect the critic's opinions. Major newspapers cover the arts in some form and dance criticism may be included. Dance criticism is available in other types of media as well, such as online publishing, through blogs, websites, and online videos.

== Current dance critics ==
Throughout the 20th century, dance critiques were available primarily through newspaper and magazine writing. With the improvement of technology, they have become increasingly available through social media platforms and blogs, significantly influencing how the general public views dance art forms.

- Joan Acocella of The New Yorker
- Jack Anderson (dance critic), formerly of The New York Times
- George Dorris, former editor of the Dance Chronicle
- Robert Gottlieb of The New York Observer
- Laura Jacobs of The New Criterion
- Deborah Jowitt, formerly of The Village Voice
- Alastair Macaulay of The New York Times
- John Rockwell, formerly of The New York Times
- Michael Seaver of The Irish Times
- Judith Mackrell of The Guardian
- Luke Jennings of The Observer

== History of dance criticism ==
- Richard Buckle
- Selma Jeanne Cohen
- Edwin Denby
- Arnold Haskell
- John Martin
