= Eugene S. Bonelli =

American musician and surgeon (1853–1912)

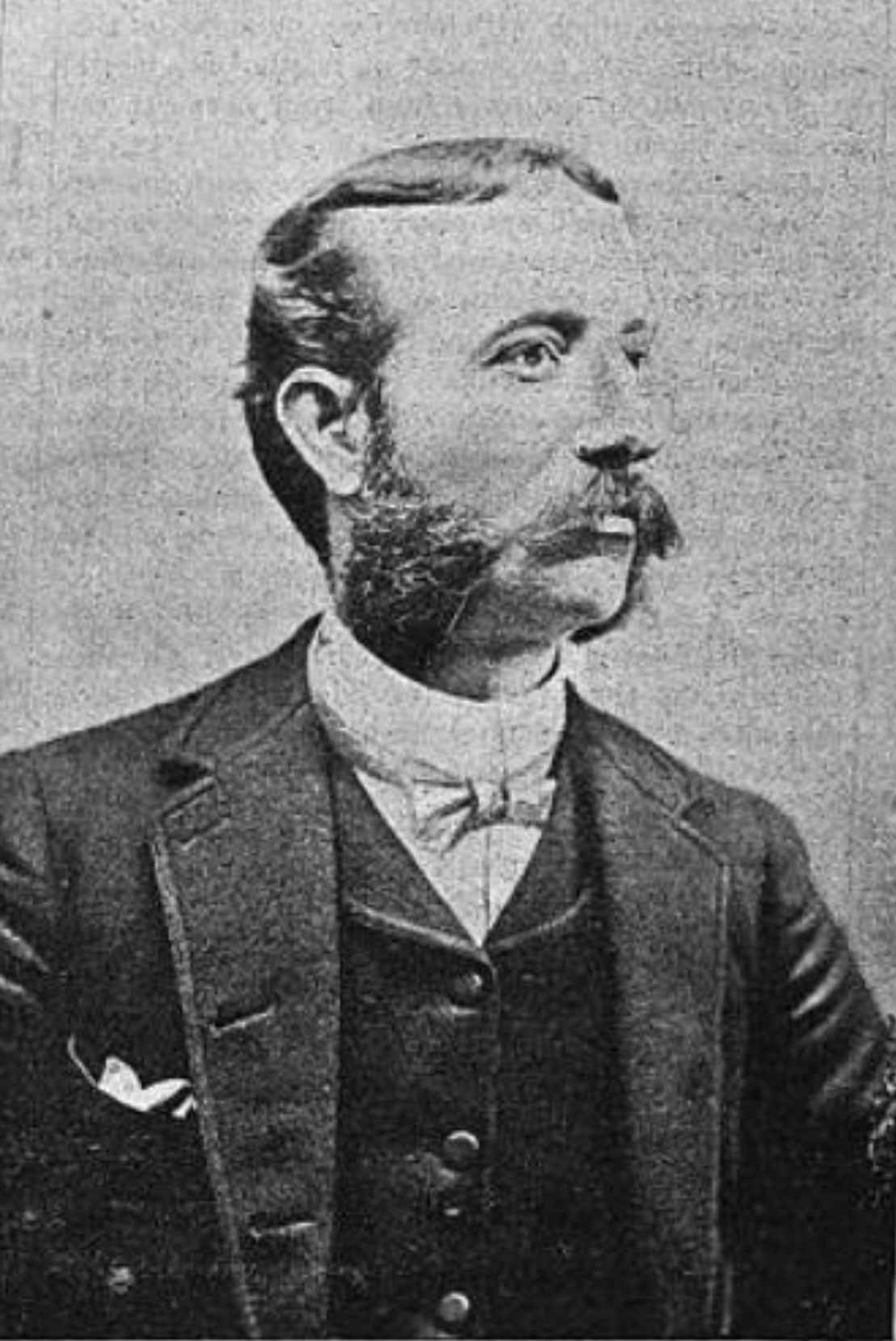
Eugene S. Bonelli in 1890

Eugene Salvadore Bonelli (September 1853 – November 24, 1912) was an American composer, pianist, music educator, and surgeon. Trained as a musician in Germany, he had a short career as a concert pianist in Europe before relocating first to South America and then the United States. After working as a musician and music teacher in Boston he relocated to San Francisco where he founded the Grand Conservatory of Music in 1890.

In addition to working as a professor of music, he studied medicine at Cooper Medical College (now Stanford University School of Medicine; then part of the University of the Pacific). He became a nationally known practitioner of a type of elective tenotomy surgery performed on the hands of musicians with the intent of improving the strength, mobility and flexibility of the ring finger. This type of surgery was popular in the United States among pianists during the 19th century and continued with less frequency into the 20th century. The efficacy of the surgery was deemed inconclusive and ultimately fell out of favor.

== Life and career ==
Eugene Salvadore Bonelli was born in September 1853 in Saint Thomas, West Indies. His Italian father served as a captain in the Royal Italian Army under Giuseppe Garibaldi, and his mother was the daughter of a Dutch baron. At the age of 12 he was sent by his parent to Europe to pursue training as a musician in Germany; studying in Hamburg, Berlin and Leipzig. He began his career as a concert pianist in Europe, but ill health led him to abandon a performance career in favor of teaching and composing.

Bonelli went to South America where he lived for three years before coming to the United States where he initially settled in Boston. There he became a well known musician and teacher. He gave a recital at Boston's YMCA in September 1873. He relocated from Boston to San Francisco in 1879. By 1880 he was teaching piano and organ in San Francisco out of a studio located at 1470 8th Street. He founded a music school on Market St in 1886. In 1889 Bonelli patented an exercising device for musicians, and his teaching method for pianists involved using mechanical devices to assist in developing technique. In 1890 he opened the Grand Conservatory of Music located at Franklin Street and Golden Gate Ave. It was at that time the only conservatory of music on the West Coast of the United States. One his pupils at the conservatory was dancer Maud Allan.

Bonelli studied at Cooper Medical College in San Francisco (now Stanford University School of Medicine) with the intent of better understanding the anatomy of the hand. He used his medical education to perform surgeries on the hands of musicians in order to attempt to improve the mechanical movement and strength of the ring finger. While several sources of the period credit Bonelli with developing this method, medical historians acknowledge that surgeries dividing the accessory tendons of the extensor digitorum muscle were performed on musicians earlier in Philadelphia by William S. Forbes beginning as early as 1857. These surgeries, known as tenotomies, were popular among pianists in the United States during 19th century, and were also sometimes sought after by other musicians such as violinists.

Bonelli became nationally famous for his tentomie (sometimes spelled tenotomy) hand surgeries on musicians; earning enthusiastic coverage in The New York Times and The Boston Globe among other publications. In 1890 The Musical Courier stated that the surgery "gave perfect freedom, higher lift, increased strength and greater stretch of hand". It also stated Bonelli's approach to this operation was the "only successful, painless and scarless method of severing the accessory slips of tendon of the ring finger". At the time of that publication it was reported that he had performed 318 such surgeries, some of them in front of large audiences. One of these operations was performed in front of an audience at Steck Hall in New York City in June 1890.

The practice of tentomie surgeries on musicians declined around the year 1900, although it continued with less frequency in the 20th century. Nicolas Slonimsky later assessed Bonelli in a 1950 article in Etude as having a "dubious career" in reference to his work as a surgeon. Historian Richard H. Dillon, stated that "Had Gaetano Merola not arrived on the scene, idiosyncratic San Francisco might have been stuck with the now-forgotten Professor E. S. Bonelli as the city’s most eminent early musician. He was both performer and instructor, with just a dash of quack doctor thrown in for good measure."

In addition to working as a professor of music, Bonelli was also a composer. Some of his compositions were inspired by Cuban dance music. His "La Danza Cuba" was published by C. N. Ditson & Co. in 1880.

Bonelli died in San Francisco on November 24, 1912. His marriage to Antonia A. A. Bonelli ended in divorce four years prior to his death.
