= John Rockwell =

American critic and arts administrator (born 1940)

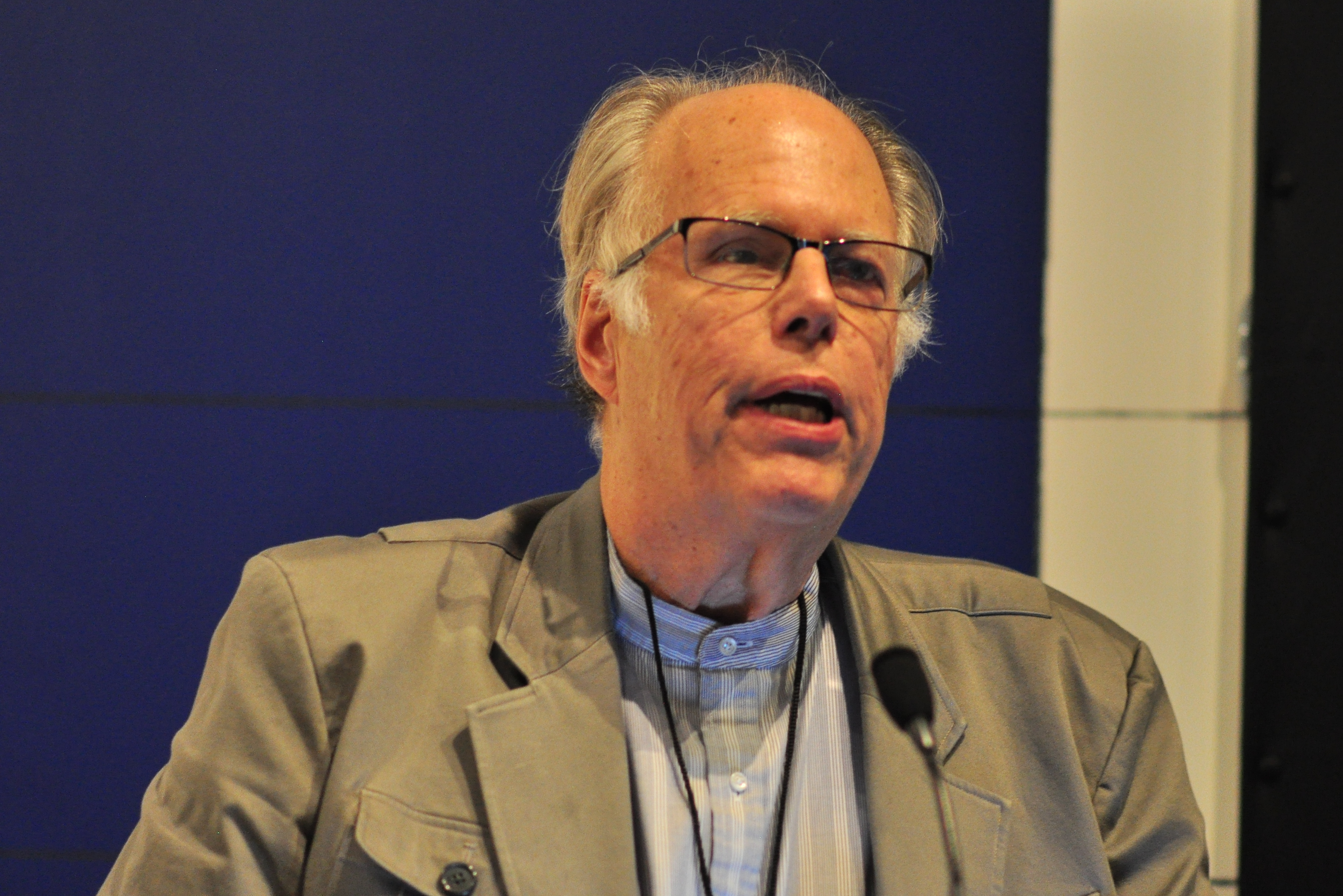
- Rockwell at the 2015 EMP Pop Conference
- Born: John Sargent Rockwell; September 16, 1940 (age 85); Washington, D.C., U.S.
- Education: Phillips Academy; Harvard University; LMU Munich; University of California, Berkeley
- Occupations: Music critic; dance critic; arts administrator
- Spouse: Linda Mevorach

John Sargent Rockwell (born September 16, 1940) is an American music critic, dance critic and arts administrator. According to Grove Music Online, "Rockwell brings two signal attributes to his critical work: a genuine admiration for all kinds of music and the arts, and the ability to fit a spirit of inquiry and enthusiasm for newer approaches to music into a reasoned overview of cultural history".

== Early life and education ==
Rockwell was born on September 16, 1940, to San Francisco attorney Alvin J. Rockwell (1908–1999) and Anna S. Hayward (1906–1983). He studied at Phillips Academy, Harvard University, LMU Munich, and the University of California, Berkeley, earning a Ph.D. in German cultural history.

== Career ==
Rockwell began his journalistic career at the Oakland Tribune and the Los Angeles Times. In 1972 he began writing at The New York Times, first as a classical music critic and reporter, then also as the paper's chief pop music critic, and, from 1992 to 1994, as the European cultural correspondent. His use of the phrase "pop punk," to describe a 1977 Tom Petty performance at a New York Club called Bottom Line, was likely the first written usage of the phrase.

Between 1994 and 1998, he served as the first director of the Lincoln Center Festival. Rockwell returned to The New York Times to become the editor of the paper's Sunday Arts and Leisure section. In 2004, he was named the chief dance critic. He left the Times at the end of 2006 to pursue independent projects.

Rockwell got his start in radio journalism at WHRB at Harvard and at KPFA in Berkeley. On WNYC Radio, Rockwell examined cultural topics and events in the news for his weekly Monday-night segment, "Rockwell Matters", from October 2007 until May 2008.

In January 2008, Rockwell was a Distinguished Visitor at the American Academy in Berlin. He is a Chevalier of the French Order of Arts & Letters.

== Personal life ==
Rockwell currently lives in Manhattan with his wife, Linda Mevorach. Their daughter, Sasha, resides in California.

== Works ==
- Rockwell, John (1983). All American Music. New York: Alfred A. Knopf. ISBN 978-0-394-51163-4.
- —— (1984). Sinatra: An American Classic. New York: Random House. ISBN 978-0-394-53977-5.
- —— (2003). The Idiots. London: BFI Film Institute. ISBN 978-0-85170-955-0.
- —— (2006). Outsider: John Rockwell on the Arts. Pompton Plains: Limelight Editions. ISBN 978-0-87910-333-0.
- ——, ed. (2014). The Times of the Sixties. New York: Black Dog & Leventhal Publishers. ISBN 978-1-57912-964-4.
