= Dorothy Alexander (dancer) =

American ballet dancer

- Born: Dorothy Sydney Moses; April 22, 1904; Atlanta, Georgia
- Died: November 17, 1986 (aged 82); Atlanta, Georgia
- Known for: Dance and choreography
- Spouse: Marion Alexander (m. 1926; div. 1927)

Dorothy Alexander (born Dorothy Sydney Moses; April 22, 1904 – November 17, 1986) was an American ballet dancer, choreographer, teacher, and company director. She was founded what is now called the Atlanta Ballet in 1929.

== Early life ==
Alexander was born in Atlanta, Georgia, the daughter of Frank Hamilton Moses and Cora Mina Thibadeau. She was one of four children in her family. Her father was a traveling salesman, and served for a time as Atlanta City Clerk. In 1910, she suffered from osteomyelitis, which was treated with a full year of bed rest and a body cast. When she recovered, she began studying dance. Her mother died in 1915 and her father died in 1920.

== Career ==
Dorothy Moses opened a ballet school in 1921; it is now the Atlanta School of Ballet. In 1925, she graduated from the Atlanta Normal School and began working as an elementary school teacher. In 1927, she began a dance program in the Atlanta Public Schools. She studied in New York City and London. She danced both in New York and Atlanta, working under choreographer Edwin Strawbridge and dance educator Lucile Marsh, as well as with the touring companies of the Hollywood Ballet and the Solomonoff-Menzelli Ballet. Following a brief marriage to Marion Alexander, she founded the Dorothy Alexander Concert Group in 1929; it was renamed the Atlanta Civic Ballet in 1941, and became the Atlanta Ballet in 1968.

Alexander was an advocate for high-quality ballet organizations outside major artistic centers like New York. She found Atlanta to be a "lonely" place for a dance enthusiast, and she worked to support dance and dance education in Atlanta and around the country. In 1956, she organized the Regional Dance America, the first regional dance festival in the United States. She helped to found the National Association for Regional Ballet (NARB) in 1963. She retired from the Atlanta Civic Ballet in 1964 due to illness, but continued to consult for both the ballet and for NARB.

== Personal life ==
Dorothy Moses married Nashville architect Marion Alexander in 1926; they divorced a year later.

== Death ==
She died of cancer on November 17, 1986.

== Awards and honors ==
- Atlanta Woman of The Year in Arts Award, 1947
- Dance Magazine Award, 1959 or 1960 (sources vary)
- Georgia Governor's Award, 1976
- Capezio Dance Award, 1981
- Honorary doctorate from Emory University, 1986
