= Raymond College =

Undergraduate college in California, 1962–1979

Coordinates: 37.9784°N 121.3131°W

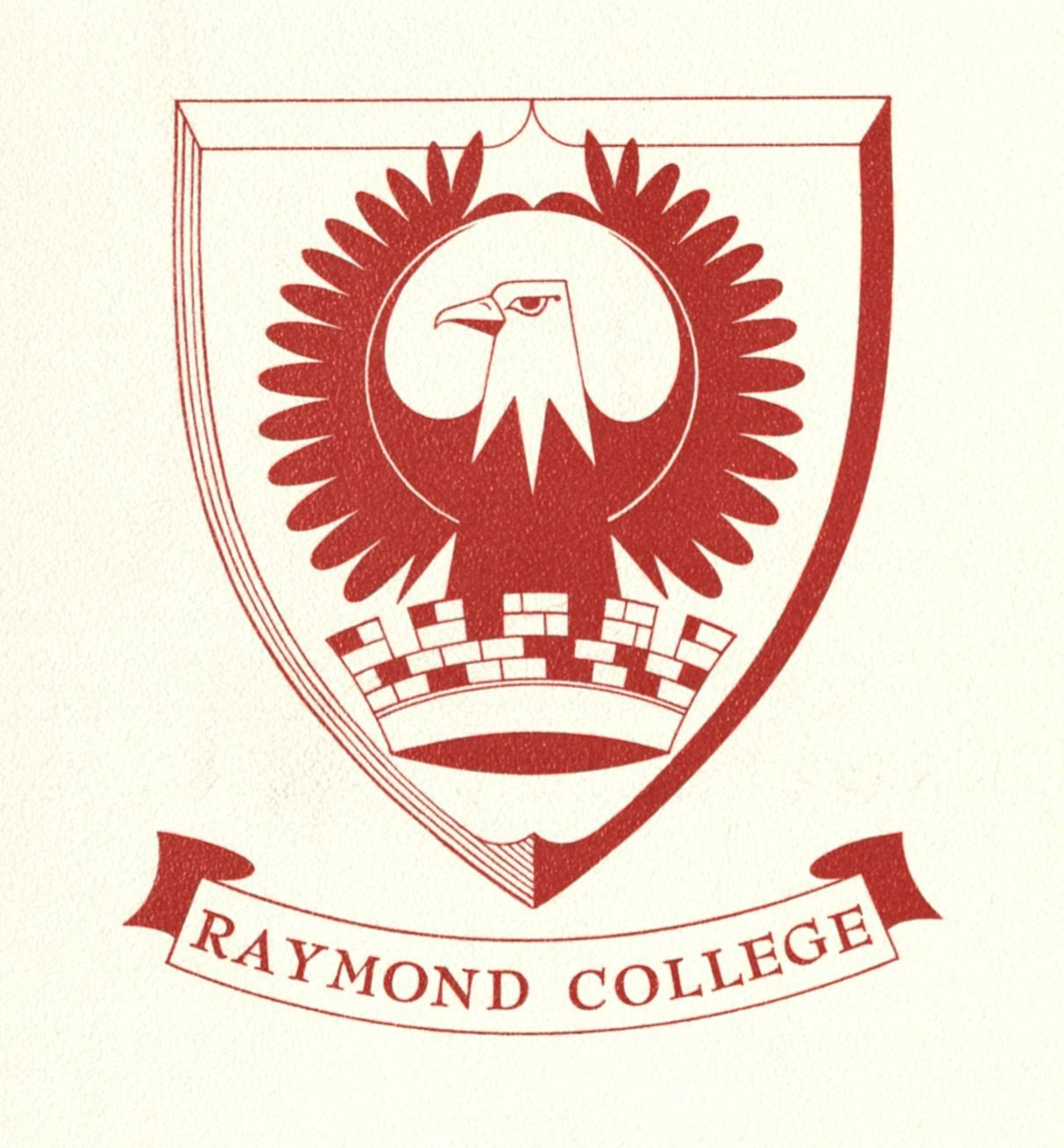
- Type: Private undergraduate honors college
- Active: 1962–1980
- Parent institution: University of the Pacific
- Location: Stockton, California, US

Raymond College was an undergraduate honors college at the University of the Pacific from the years 1962 to 1980. Located in Stockton, California, it had an interdisciplinary curriculum that emphasized learning in the natural sciences, social sciences, and humanities, styling itself in the tradition of the liberal arts. Raymond College initially offered an accelerated three-year program, though it moved to offer a four-year program as well in the 1970s. The curriculum emphasized seminar style learning, only offered a single interdisciplinary major, and students received written evaluations (called term letters) rather than traditional letter grades.

== History ==
Raymond was the first of the three cluster colleges developed under University of the Pacific President Robert Burns. President Burns, driven by the pressure of a new generation of qualified applicants, decided that the best way to serve these students was to develop cluster colleges: small colleges offering a unique undergraduate education. He stated that "growing larger by growing smaller" was the best way to expand the university while maintaining the high-quality personalized education that he viewed as essential to Pacific. He based this new model on Oxford, Cambridge, and the Claremont colleges, noticing their success and viewing these new residential cluster colleges as a force for improved academic standards at and renewed attention for the university. Covell College, a college entirely taught in Spanish and aimed at an inter-American audience, and Callison College, a college focused on Asian studies that offered the opportunity to spend a year abroad in Asia, were the other two cluster colleges, launched in 1963 and 1967 respectively.

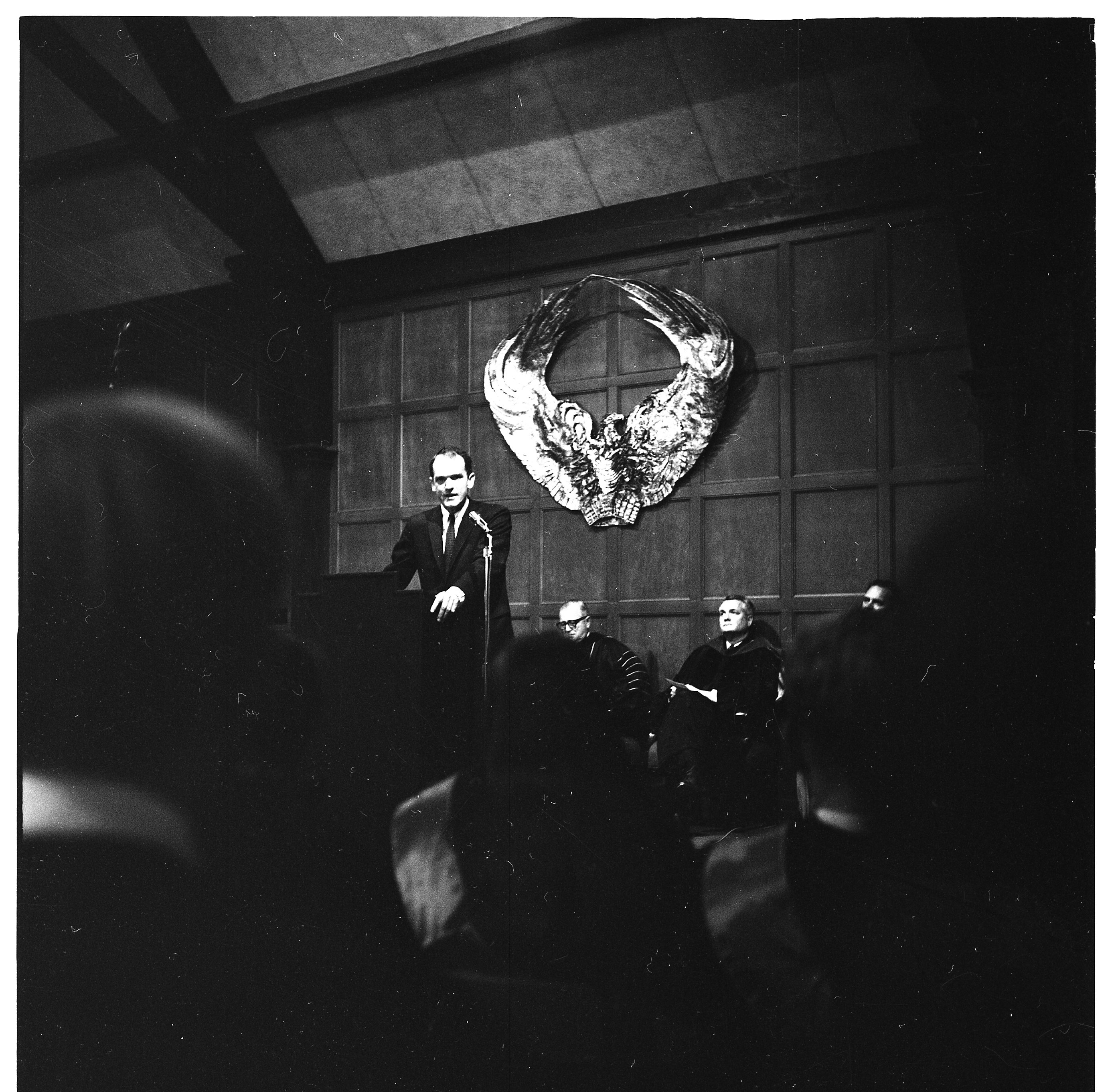
Provost Martin, the first Provost of Raymond College

Raymond College was funded by the donation of property by Mr. and Mrs. Walter Raymond, which was sold to fund the college. The first Provost of Raymond College was Provost Warren Bryan Martin. Provost Martin brought the perspective that President Burns had most wanted for the school, emphasizing the importance of the liberal arts and the preparation of the whole student for a fulfilling, engaged life. The first class of students arrived in the fall of 1962.

In these first years, the curriculum was strictly structured, with students following a rigid curriculum designed to build upon itself. Each academic year included three 12-week semesters. The key components of this curriculum included:

- A first semester class titled the Introduction to the Modern World, designed as a shared cohort experience for all incoming first year students.
- A year of language study.
- A sequence of math, physics, chemistry, and biology, taken in that order.
- Humanities classes in literature, philosophy, art, and religion.
- Social science classes in economics, history, psychology, and sociology.

There were also two comprehensive examinations: the first examination took place at the end of the first year of study and the final examination took place at the end of the last year of study. The curricular demands were intense, with heavy reading and writing loads; dropout rates during these early years of Raymond college were high. One alum estimated a third of students dropped out before completing their degree.

Provost Martin took a leave of absence, then left Raymond entirely during the 1965-66 academic year. A new provost, Berndt Kolker, was selected to lead the college starting in the 66-67 academic year and began to re-envision the curriculum. One major impact of these revisions was the end of the strict three-year track; Raymond transitioned to a more flexible model that offered both a three-year and a four-year track. The curricular structure also gradually loosened; students could take a greater diversity of courses, and professors responded by developing new courses beyond the regimented structure, with such titles as "Utopias", "Alternatives to the Nuclear Family", and "Comparative Totalitarianism: Russia and Germany". This new flexibility offered a great deal of intellectual experimentation, and this expanded dramatically over the course of the 1970s.

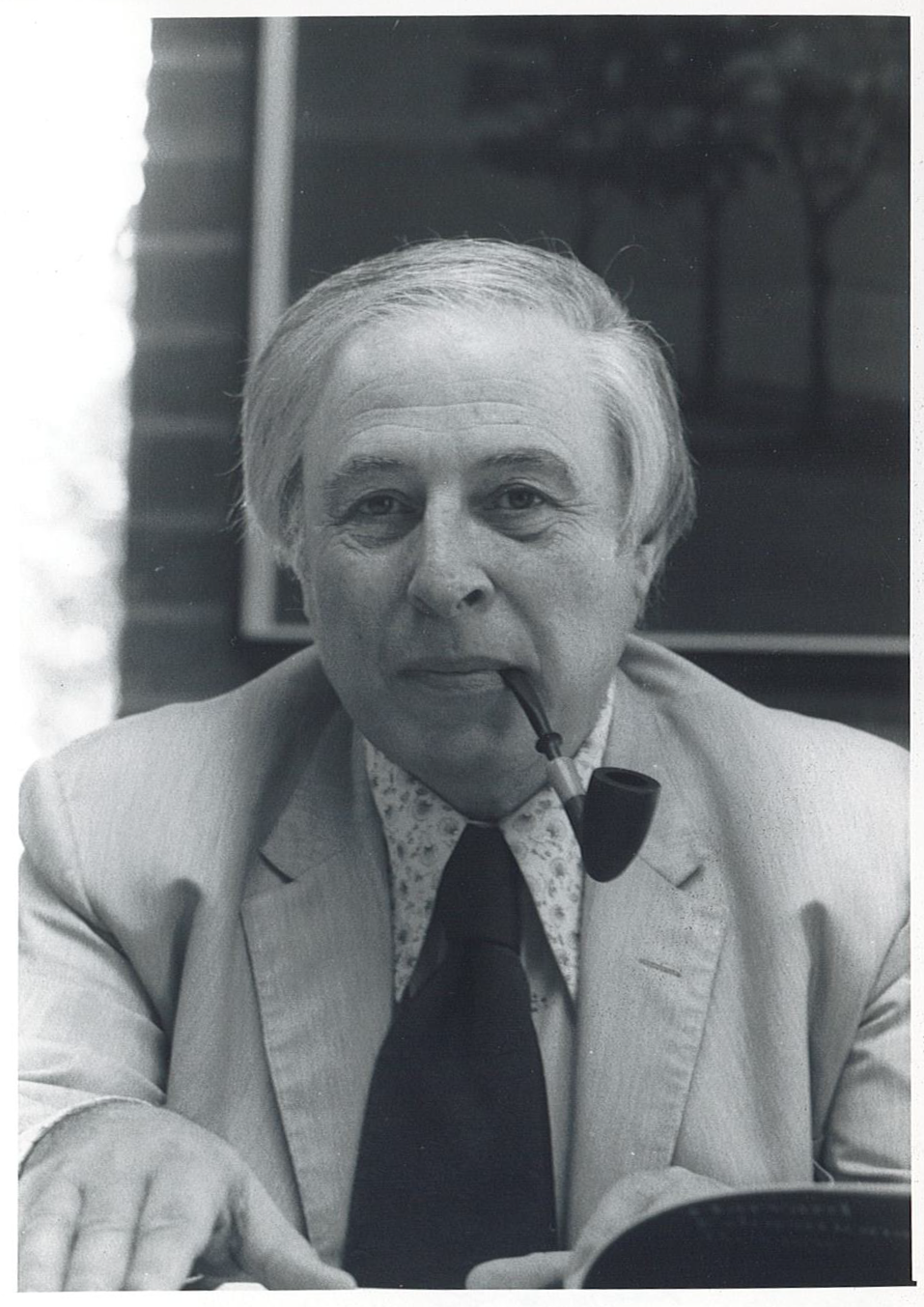
Provost Berndt Kolker

President Burns's death in 1971 rocked the University of the Pacific, and excitement about the cluster colleges fell under the subsequent president, President McCaffrey. During a time of economic malaise in the United States, students were looking to college to provide a sense of security and a path into middle class professions, and the cluster colleges' 60s idealism had reduced appeal to many students. Raymond College responded by shifting to the same academic calendar as the College of the Pacific, with a fall semester, a January month-long winter term (offering accelerated classes, study abroad, or independent study opportunities), and a spring semester. It also ended the science requirement and provided Raymond students with more career preparation opportunities.

Raymond College continued to struggle throughout the 70s. In an effort to increase appeal, they began to offer traditional grades for those students who wanted them for graduate school, though term letters remained the norm. But declining enrollments continued to plague the school, and it merged with Callison in 1977 to form Raymond-Callison or Ray-Cal. This persisted briefly before Raymond-Callison itself was declared unsuccessful during the 1978-1979 academic year; it was folded into the College of the Pacific, the liberal arts school at Pacific, at the end of the spring semester in 1980.

Raymond College had a significant impact on the university, even after it closed. Many faculty members moved into the College of the Pacific and brought with them new ideas about how best to educate their students. Alumni also continue to advocate for small classes and seminar learning.

Alumni of Raymond College went on to work in an exceptionally wide variety of careers, from hard sciences to business to policy to law to teaching, utilizing their broad education across different disciplines.

== Unique Features ==
Raymond College incorporated a number of unique features that made the experience there different from that at the College of the Pacific, the traditional liberal arts core of the university.

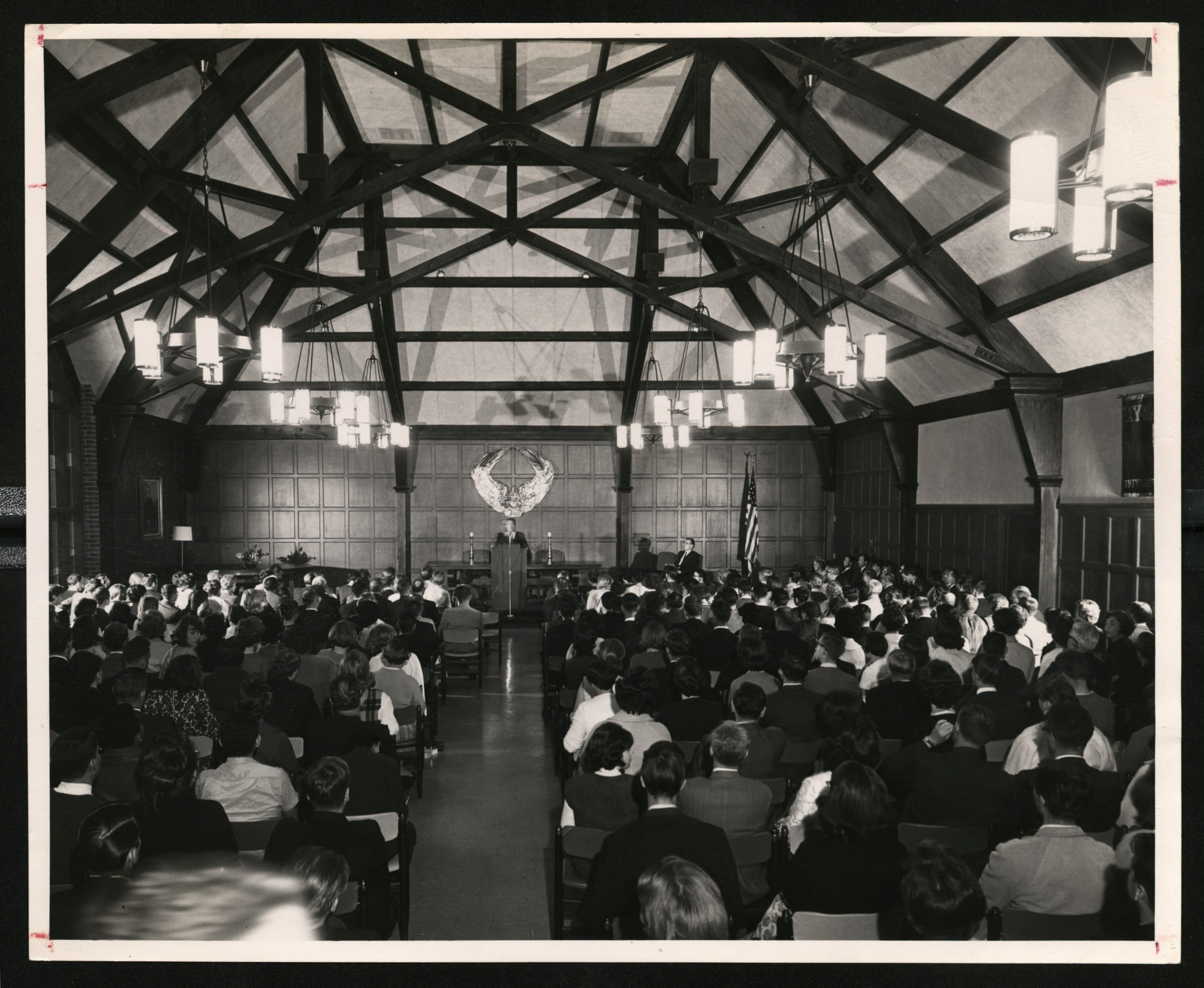
Dr. Samuel Ichiye Hayakawa speaking at Raymond High Table

Raymond College held weekly High Table sessions, which were inspired by the Oxford-Cambridge model that President Burns had worked to incorporate. Each High Table would include a formal dinner and a presentation from that week's speaker, followed by discussion in the Raymond Common Room (a central gathering space.) Some speakers sparked controversy, and the roster included people from such diverse backgrounds as Angela Davis, John Rousselot of the John Birch Society, and United Nations officials.

Classes were not graded through traditional letter grades. Rather, students received term letters in which their professor described how well they did in the class and provided individualized feedback. Students received one of three grade levels during the early years; these were unsatisfactory (a failing grade), satisfactory, and superior. This changed in the mid 1960s to just two levels: unsatisfactory and satisfactory. The remainder of the term letter would provide context for the grade and give the student feedback for how they could improve. This led to an issue that worsened over the years. Raymond students who were interested in graduate school often had trouble providing the schools they applied to with GPAs. Because of this, in the late 60s and 70s, Raymond began to translate those term letters when necessary to traditional letter grades.

Faculty at Raymond College were deeply integrated into the lives of students. In the early years, many Raymond professors lived in apartments on the bottom floor of the residence halls. While this approach faded over the years because of faculty burnout, faculty continued to have lunch with students and invite classes over to their houses, resulting in an environment in which students could continue discussing and learning from their faculty mentors even after class was over.

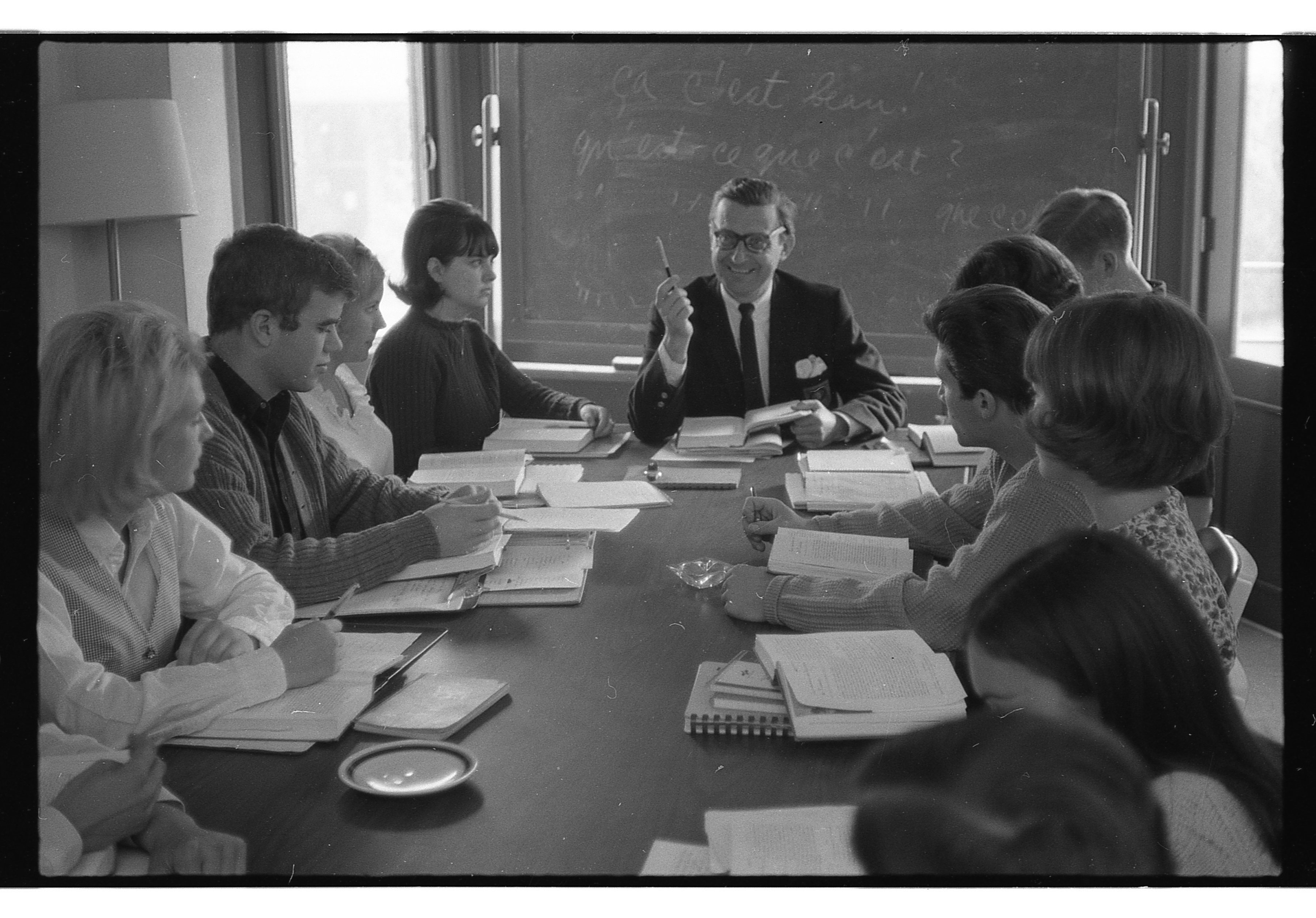
Raymond College class

Raymond, as compared to a traditional collegiate structure, never had majors or academic departments. While there sometimes would be multiple professors who taught in a certain discipline, they would not be organized into traditional departments. In Raymond's early years, students would take classes in every discipline in the prescribed curriculum. In later years, they were freer to choose courses based on interest. Regardless, all students graduated with an interdisciplinary liberal arts major.

Additionally, in the early years, students at Raymond were not allowed to join social fraternities or sororities. While this restriction did loosen, joining Greek life and/or competitive athletics were consistently deemphasized throughout the Raymond years. This drew a distinction between Raymond and the university at large, which was dominated by a football-oriented culture and an active social Greek life. This difference led to divisions and disagreements between the cluster colleges and the rest of the university. Raymond alumni often refer to this as the Eucalyptus Curtain, drawing a parallel between the row of trees separating the schools and the differences in perspective between them.

== Controversies ==
Raymond had a number of internal controversies that reflected both the structure of the college as well as the tenor of the times. In the early years, Raymond College was, according to one alum, "academically innovative and socially traditional, if not reactionary." This meant strict curfews for women, following the dominant in loco parentis idea that defined many colleges in the fifties and allowed them to assume responsibility for 'protecting' their female students. Dress codes were also imposed on students; women were not allowed to wear pants. Students opposed these restrictions, but the college administration was not responsive to this changing culture under Provost Martin.

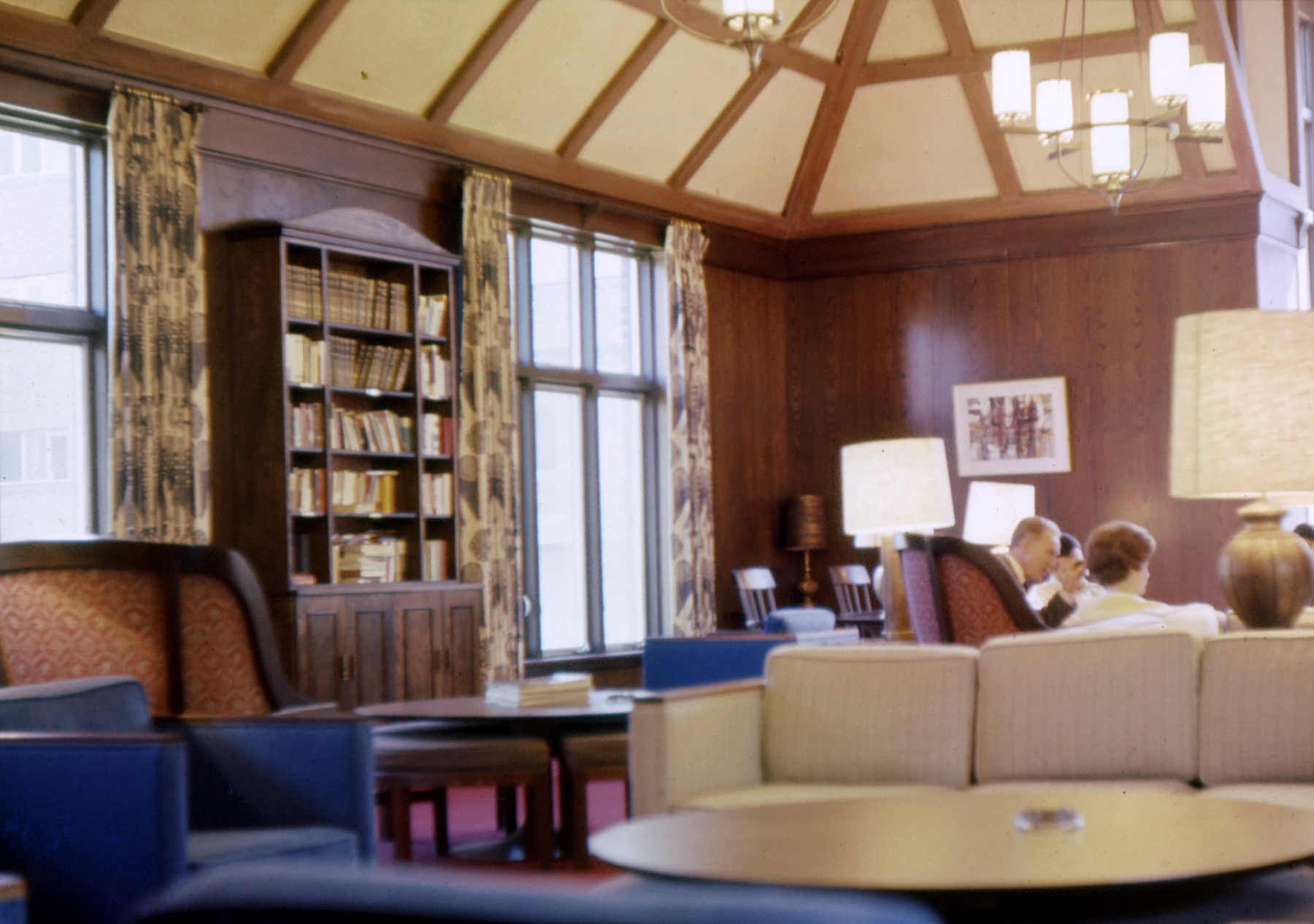
The Raymond Common Room

That began to change with the arrival of Berndt Kolker and the subsequent exit of the conservative Dean of Student Life, Edmund Peckham. Co-ed residential halls appeared, dress codes eased, and curfews disappeared as students were given more autonomy to decide how to regulate themselves. In addition, alcohol and marijuana usage began to increase as Raymond College transformed into a school that, while nevertheless remaining academically rigorous, was firmly embedded in the counterculture movements of the time.

The Vietnam War was a driving issue for many students, especially men, as the end of their undergraduate years meant the end of their ability to defer the draft. For many, opposition to the Vietnam War and the draft was a crucial component of their years at Pacific, with Raymond students going so far as to hold protests of US government actions during the war and regularly going to join the protests over at UC Berkeley. Raymond College and the University of the Pacific also held moratorium days in which students were encouraged to attend teach-ins on the war, attempting to provide an outlet that was less disruptive to student learning.

== Public Reception ==
The initial establishment of Raymond College and the cluster colleges more generally was met with articles in the Wall Street Journal and LA Times. They generally praised Pacific's commitment to increasing educational diversity and suggested that the unique curricula of the cluster colleges would make them last longer than other experimental colleges.

The cluster college model was successful enough to earn emulation by UC Santa Cruz in 1965, in one of the few cluster college concept models that survives to this day.
