= Atlanta Ballet =

Ballet company in Atlanta, Georgia

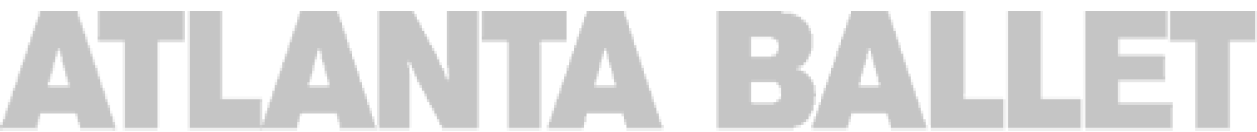

General information
- Name: Atlanta Ballet
- Year founded: 1929
- Founder: Dorothy Alexander
- Founding artistic director: Dorothy Alexander
- Principal venue: Atlanta, Georgia, United States
- Website: www.atlantaballet.com

Artistic staff
- Artistic director: Gennadi Nedvigin
- Ballet masters: Angela Agresti; Eduardo Permuy; Rory Hohenstein
- Resident choreographers: Claudia Schreier

Other
- Official school: Atlanta Ballet Centre for Dance Education

Atlanta Ballet is a ballet company, located in Atlanta, Georgia. It is the longest continuously performing ballet company in the United States and the State Ballet of Georgia.

== History ==
Atlanta Ballet was founded in 1929 by Dorothy Alexander as the Dorothy Alexander Concert Group. During the 1940s, the organization was known as the Atlanta Civic Ballet, with Dorothy Alexander acting as director. It was the nation's first regional ballet company. In 1946, the company became the first in the nation to help fund a symphony by donating the season's annual proceeds to the Atlanta Youth Symphony, which later developed into the Atlanta Symphony Orchestra.

In the 1950s, Robert Barnett joined the company from New York City Ballet as a principal dancer and associate director. Barnett received exclusive permission from George Balanchine to use his choreography for The Nutcracker as well as other signature works, making Atlanta Civic Ballet the only company in the country to perform works by Balanchine outside of New York City Ballet for several decades. Alexander guided her dance company for more than three decades before hand-picking her successor, Robert Barnett, who was named artistic director in 1961. In 1967, the company gained professional status as Atlanta Ballet.

In 1994, Robert Barnett retired from his role as artistic director and John McFall accepted the position. The focus of the company has shifted to include education.

In September 2015, the Atlanta Ballet Board of Trustees chair Allen W. Nelson announced artistic director John McFall would be leaving the organization. McFall joined Atlanta Ballet in 1994.

In February 2016, Atlanta Ballet announced Gennadi Nedvigin, principal dancer with the San Francisco Ballet would be joining the organization in August 2016. Nedvigin was born in Rostov, Russia, trained with The Bolshoi Ballet Academy and danced with Jeune Ballet de France before joining San Francisco Ballet as a soloist in 1997.

== Atlanta Ballet today ==
The Company

Dancers
- Jacob Bush, USA; Jackie Nash, USA; Nadia Mara, Uruguay; Jared Tan. USA

The company employs 40 professional dancers in their main company and 16 dancers in their second company. Unlike many professional ballet companies, Atlanta Ballet does not divide its dancers into specifically designated ranks such as principal, soloist, or corps de ballet. Instead, company members all have an equal chance at being cast in leading roles for each ballet. The regular season runs from September to May with performances the Cobb Energy Performing Arts Centre. Spring 2011 marked the company's debut on the Alliance Stage at the Woodruff Arts Center for their performance of Ignition.

In addition to a vast collection of story ballets, ranging from Swan Lake to The Great Gatsby, The Atlanta Ballet has taken part in two collaborations with Grammy Award-winning artists. In 2001, the Indigo Girls joined them for the world premiere of Shed Your Skin choreographed by Margo Sappington, and in 2008, they joined forces with Antwan "Big Boi" Patton from Outkast for the world premiere of big choreographed by Lauri Stallings.

Atlanta Ballet celebrated its 80th anniversary in the 2009–10 season. The company also celebrated its 50th year of the Nutcracker, as well as artistic director, John McFall's 15th season. The ballet also welcomed new executive director Arthur Jacobus to the company. For the 2010–2011 season, the Atlanta Ballet performed Moulin Rouge: The Ballet, Atlanta Ballet's Nutcracker, Nutty Nutcracker, Sleeping Beauty, Fusion: Lambarena as a world premier, and Ignition: New Choreographic Voices. The 2012–13 season included Michael Pink's Dracula, David Bintley's Carmina Burana, Ohad Naharin's Minus 16, Nutcracker, Cinderella and Gina Patterson's I Am. For the 2014–2015 season, the Atlanta Ballet performances include Nutcracker, Roméo et Juliette, Snow White, Camino Real, Modern Choreographic Voices, and MAYhem. MAYhem included THREE, The Exiled, and 1st Flash.

== Education ==
In 1996, Atlanta Ballet opened the Centre for Dance Education, under the direction of John McFall and Sharon Story as dean. Today there are three locations in Virginia-Highlands, Buckhead, and West Midtown Atlanta. One of the largest fully accredited dance schools in the country, the centre educates students ages two through adult in various disciplines such as ballet, jazz, modern, tap, hip hop, pilates, and flamenco.

== Choreographing Our Future campaign ==
In April 2009, the Robert W. Woodruff foundation made a $1 million commitment toward the Atlanta Ballet's $14.8 million "Choreographing Our Future" campaign, the largest fundraising effort in the company's history. The campaign not only funded the renovation and relocation to the new headquarters in Midtown West, but it also went towards expanding the marketing and development for the ballet. The ballet also received the single largest gift in its 79-year history – $3 million from the Michael C. and Thalia N. Carlos Foundation. The donations were part of a campaign to purchase and renovate the new headquarters on Marietta Boulevard west of midtown. The $3 million from the Carlos Foundation, to be paid over four years, is a naming gift: The new headquarters, which opened in May 2010, is named the Michael C. Carlos Dance Centre. The funds from the $14.8 million campaign will also be channeled into boosting the ballet's endowment, marketing and audience development, and toward long-term financial and artistic stability. Integral to the package is the inclusion of the Atlanta Ballet Orchestra in performances.

The new Atlanta Ballet headquarters was built in a 5,000 foot renovated warehouse.

== Notes ==
Sources

- "Dorothy Alexander". Encyclopædia Britannica. (subscription required)
