= Marcel Dekker =

Former American publisher

- Status: Defunct
- Founded: 1963
- Successor: Taylor & Francis
- Country of origin: United States
- Headquarters location: New York City
- Publication types: Books, academic journals

Marcel Dekker was a journal and encyclopedia publishing company with editorial boards found in New York City. Dekker encyclopedias are now published by CRC Press, part of the Taylor and Francis publishing group.

== History ==
Initially a textbook publisher, the company added journal publishing in the 1970s, and encyclopedia publishing in the early 1980s. Serving mathematics, it published a series of Lecture Notes in Pure and Applied Mathematics.

The company was purchased by Taylor and Francis in 2003. At that time, it published 78 journals and 300 new books annually. The imprint closed in 2005. As of 2008, they have a total of 26 encyclopedias available. These encyclopedias deal with scientific issues such as agricultural engineering, chemistry, agronomy, and library science.
