= Michael Seaver =

Irish musician

Michael Seaver (born 1967) is a writer and musician in Ireland. He is the dance critic at The Irish Times and Irish correspondent with the Christian Science Monitor, as well as principal clarinetist with the RTÉ Concert Orchestra. He also writes for Ballet Tanz, Dance Theatre Journal, Dance Magazine and Dance Europe.

Publications include Stepping into Footprints: The Globalization of Irish Dance from Dance in a World of Change (2008). In 2004 he received a New York Times / National Endowment for the Arts fellowship for his dance writing and was scholar-in-residence at the 2005 Bates Dance Festival. Former vice-president of Dance Research Forum Ireland, he has also served on the editorial board of the journal Choreographic Encounters.
