= Laura Jacobs =

American writer

- Education: Northwestern University (BA)
- Occupations: Novelist; journalist; critic
- Spouse: James Wolcott

Laura Jacobs is an American novelist, journalist, and critic. Jacobs is a regular contributor to The Wall Street Journal, where she reviews museum exhibitions on fashion. She was a staff writer at Vanity Fair from 1995 to 2018, where she wrote award-winning pieces for the magazine on the subjects of design, fashion, and the performing arts. In 2019, she became the Arts Intel Report editor for AIR MAIL, a weekly international digital newsletter co-edited by Graydon Carter and Alessandra Stanley.

== Background and education ==
Laura Jacobs hails from Chicago, Illinois, and holds a B.A. in English Literature from Northwestern University.

== Works ==
Jacobs's most recent book, published in 2018 [Basic Books] is Celestial Bodies: How to Look at Ballet. The Bird Catcher, her second novel, was published in June 2009, by St. Martin's Press. In July, 2010 Picador released a paperback edition. Her first novel, Women About Town, a Literary Guild selection, was published by Viking Press in 2002, with French and Polish editions, followed by a paperback from Penguin.

== Career ==
Jacobs began writing at Vanity Fair in 1995, and produced award-winning pieces on design, fashion, and the performing arts. She has profiled the mid-century American designers Norman Norell, Charles James, Adrian, and Mainbocher, and has made a specialty of writing about iconic American women, including Emily Post, Gypsy Rose Lee, Lilly Pulitzer, Grace Kelly, Suzy Parker and Julia Child.

Since 2012 Jacobs has reviewed fashion exhibitions in museums for The Wall Street Journal. She also contributes to the London Review of Books.

Jacobs began writing dance criticism in Chicago at the Chicago Reader. She has written about dance for The Atlantic Monthly, and held dance critic posts at The Boston Phoenix and The New Leader. Since 1994, Jacobs has been the dance critic at The New Criterion. In 2006 a collection of her New Criterion essays -- Landscape with Moving Figures: A Decade on Dance—was published by Dance & Movement Press.

From 1987 to 1995, Jacobs was the editor in chief of Stagebill, the national performing arts program magazine whose constituents included Lincoln Center, The Kennedy Center, Carnegie Hall, theater in Chicago, and orchestras and opera companies around the country. During the late nineties, Jacobs wrote fashion criticism for both Modern Review and The New Republic. She collaborated with the fashion designer Geoffrey Beene on Beauty and the Beene (Abrams Books, 1999) and edited his last book, Beene by Beene (The Vendome Press, 2005).

== Personal ==
Jacobs is a member of The Linnaean Society of New York. As a member of the Seaside Sparrows team, she has competed regularly in New Jersey Audubon's annual World Series of Birding. Jacobs is married to the writer James Wolcott, and lives in Washington Heights in New York City.
