= Jack Anderson (dance critic) =

American poet and dance critic (1935–2023)

- Born: June 15, 1935; Milwaukee, Wisconsin, U.S.
- Died: October 20, 2023 (aged 88); New York City, New York, U.S.
- Education: Northwestern University; Indiana University; University of California, Berkeley
- Occupations: Poet; dance critic; dance historian
- Notable credit(s): The New York Times; Dancing Times and Dance Magazine (magazines); The One and Only: The Ballet Russe de Monte Carlo and Ballet & Modern Dance: A Concise History (books)
- Spouse: George Dorris (m. 2006)

Jack Warren Anderson (June 15, 1935 – October 20, 2023) was an American poet, dance critic, and dance historian. He is well known for his numerous reviews of dance performances in The New York Times and Dance Magazine as well as for his scholarly studies in dance history and for eleven volumes of poetry.

== Early life and education ==
Jack Warren Anderson was born in Milwaukee, Wisconsin, where his father, George, was a motion picture projectionist at a downtown movie theater and his mother, Eleanore, was a hospital administrator. As a youth, Jack took piano lessons and acted in little theater groups before leaving home to go to college. At Northwestern University he earned a bachelor's degree with a major in theater and minors in English literature and philosophy, and at Indiana University he earned a master's degree in creative writing. He pursued further graduate study at the University of California at Berkeley but abandoned it after a year when he got his first job with a newspaper.

== Journalism ==
In 1959, Anderson joined the staff of the Oakland Tribune, starting as a copy boy but becoming the assistant drama critic the next year. He also began writing dance criticism for the English monthly Ballet Today and contributing to Dance Magazine, the leading dance periodical in America. In 1964 Anderson moved to New York and joined the editorial staff of Dance Magazine, where he worked until 1970. After leaving his staff position he continued to contribute critical reviews of dance performances until 1978, when he became one of the three dance critics of The New York Times, along with Anna Kisselgoff and Jennifer Dunning. He remained in this post until retiring in 2005. However, he continued his affiliation with the Times as a freelancer for some years afterward, preparing listings and writing obituaries of notable figures in the dance world.

In 1970–71, while living in London with his partner, George Dorris, he served as the deputy dance critic to Oleg Kerensky (1930–1993) for the Daily Mail and occasionally appeared on the BBC radio show Kaleidoscope, talking about dance, and in 1972 he became the New York correspondent for The Dancing Times of London. In acknowledgment of his expertise, he was asked to serve on the dance panel of the National Endowment for the Arts from 1975 to 1978.

== Dance history ==
Largely self-taught as a dance historian, at a time when there were no established programs in dance history, Anderson began writing and teaching dance history during the 1970s. In 1977 he and George Dorris became the founding co-editors of the scholarly journal Dance Chronicle: Studies in Dance and the Related Arts. Together, they made it one of the leading periodicals of dance history, with high standards of scholarship. After many successful years, they passed it on to younger editors in 2007.

Widely recognized as an effective teacher and an entertaining lecturer, Anderson was invited to teach dance history and criticism at the American Dance Festival, the University of Adelaide (Australia), the North Carolina School of the Arts, the University of Minnesota, the College of St. Catherine (St. Paul, Minnesota), the New School for Social Research, Herbert L. Lehman College (New York City), and the University of Wisconsin, Milwaukee. In 2011 he was named to the Brackett Distinguished Visiting Artist Chair at the University of Oklahoma and was invited to give the commencement address at the college division of the New World School of the Arts in Miami.

From the 1970s through the 1990s, Anderson undertook various research projects in dance history and eventually produced seven books on various subjects:

- Dance. New York: Newsweek Books, 1974.
- The Nutcracker. London: Bison Books, 1979.
- The One and Only: The Ballet Russe de Monte Carlo. Durham, N.C.: Duke University Press, 1981.
- Ballet & Modern Dance: A Concise History (1983). 2d ed. Pennington, N.J.: Princeton Book Company, 1995. Third edition, 2018.
- The American Dance Festival. Durham, N.C.: Duke University Press, 1987.
- Choreography Observed. Iowa City: University of Iowa Press, 1987.
- Art without Boundaries: The World of Modern Dance. Iowa City: University of Iowa Press, 1997.

His comprehensive and detailed account of the Ballet Russe de Monte Carlo, which flourished in the United States from 1938 until the early 1960s, won the 1981 José de la Torre Bueno Prize for the best English-language writing in dance history, and his concise history of ballet and modern dance, published in 1986, was so popular with general readers and as a textbook for students that a second edition was issued in 1992.

== Poetry ==
Throughout his adult life, Anderson has been drawn to poetic expression. In 1969 he published the first two of his ten books of poetry. His poems have also appeared in many literary magazines and anthologies, and one of his prose poems provided the title for the anthology The Party Train (Minneapolis: New Rivers Press, 1995). He has been a visiting writer at the College of DuPage in Illinois, a poet-in-residence at the University of Kansas, and reader of his poems at various colleges and cultural centers in the United States, Canada, England, and Australia.

Anderson's published collections of poems are as follows:

- The Hurricane Lamp. Trumansburg, N.Y.: New/Books, 1969.
- The Invention of New Jersey. Pittsburgh: University of Pittsburgh Press, 1969.
- City Joys. New York: Release Press, 1975.
- Selected Poems. New York: Release Press, 1975.
- Toward the Liberation of the Left Hand. Pittsburgh. University of Pittsburgh Press, 1977.
- The Dust Dancers. Kansas City: Book Mark Press, 1978.
- The Clouds of That Country. Brooklyn: Hanging Loose Press, 1982.
- Field Trips on the Rapid Transit. Brooklyn: Hanging Loose Press, 1990.
- Traffic: New and Selected Prose Poems. Minneapolis: New Rivers Press, 1998.
- Getting Lost in a City Like This. Brooklyn: Hanging Loose Press, 2009.
- Backyards of the Universe. Brooklyn: Hanging Loose Press, 2017.

In recognition of the excellence of his work, Anderson received both a National Endowment for the Arts creative writing fellowship and a National Endowment literary award. He has also enjoyed the approval and recognition of fellow poets. Morton Marcus (1936–2009), for one, offered the following encomium: "Jack Anderson's prodigious imagination creates alternate realities as easily as if they were prefabricated worlds, but so close to our own are they in every wickedly funny and poignant detail that we soon realize we've not been looking out a window but at a mirror. . . . His pictures of the life we lead are satiric gems, yet so consummate an artist is he that at each thrust of his sardonic wit the reader can do nothing but laugh uproariously and demand more."

== Personal life ==
Anderson was married to George Dorris, a dance scholar and English professor. Having known each other slightly at Northwestern University, they met again in 1965 on the subway platform at Lincoln Center after a New York City Ballet performance. Together, they have traveled widely and become friends with dance writers and scholars in many countries around the world. They were married in Toronto in 2006, and lived in Greenwich Village.

Anderson died from sepsis at a hospital in Manhattan on October 20, 2023, at the age of 88.

== See also ==
- LGBT culture in New York City
- List of LGBT people from New York City
- NYC Pride March
- Poetry analysis
