= Dance Chronicle =

- Discipline: Dance
- Language: English
- Edited by: Rainy Demerson and Kate Mattingly

Publication details
- History: 1977-present
- Publisher: Routledge
- Frequency: Triannually

Standard abbreviations
- ISO 4: Dance Chron.

Indexing
- ISSN: 0147-2526 (print); 1532-4257 (web)
- LCCN: 78640727
- OCLC no.: 3525358

Links
- Journal homepage; Online access; Online archive

Dance Chronicle: Studies in Dance and the Related Arts is a triannual peer-reviewed academic journal focusing on dance. It was established in 1977 and first published in 1978 by Marcel Dekker. The founding editors-in-chief were George Dorris and Jack Anderson, who edited the journal for thirty years, until 2007. In 2003, publication of the journal was transferred to Routledge. The current co-editors are Rainy Demerson (Editor-in-Chief) and Kate Mattingly (Executive Editor).

The journal covers a wide range of topics relating to dance, including music, theater, film, literature, painting, and aesthetics. Individual issues have been devoted to such topics as Moscow's Island of Dance, August Bournonville, and the Camargo Society.
