= Frank-Manuel Peter =

German dancer

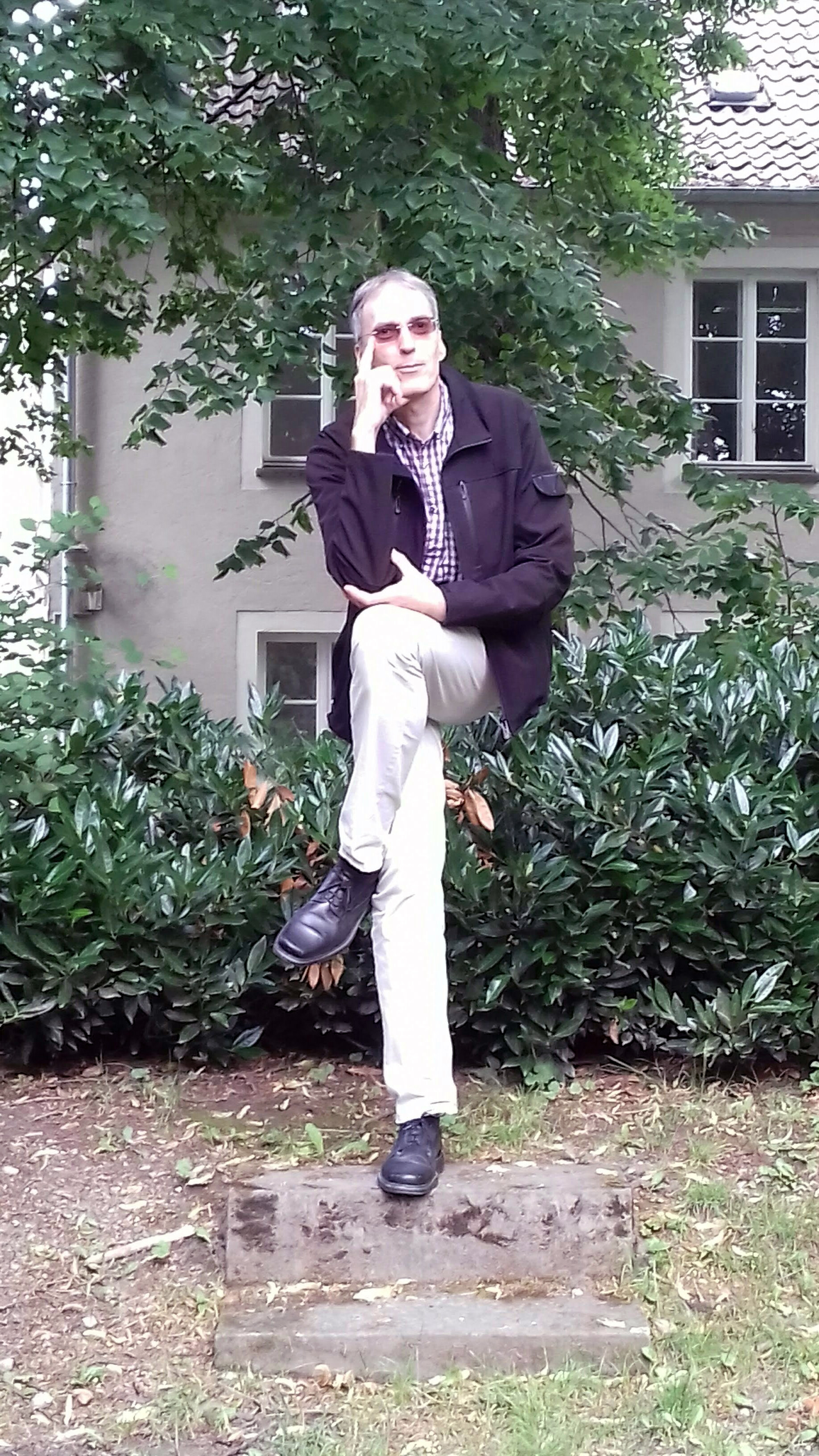
Frank-Manuel Peter in the performance Monuments Man (I) in Schloss Freudenthal (2019).

Frank-Manuel Peter (born 1959) is a German dance researcher and historian.

== Life and work ==
Born in Berlin, Peter studied theatre, history of art, German studies and library science at the Free University of Berlin and graduated as a master's degree. In 2004, he was promoted to Ph.D. with a thesis on Dore Hoyer.

Peter has been director of the Deutsches Tanzarchiv Köln since 1986. He has been a lecturer since 2005 and an honorary professor for the dance studies programme at the Hochschule für Musik und Tanz Köln since 2012.

He is in charge of the book series Studien und Dokumente zur Tanzwissenschaft published by the Deutsches Tanzarchiv Köln, with Walter Salmen and from volume 8 onwards with Gabriele Busch-Salmen the series Terpsichore - Tanzhistorische Studien and the Bibliographie deutschsprachiger Hochschulschriften zur Tanzwissenschaft/Tanzforschung.

Peter is a member of the advisory board of the Alexander and Renata Camaro foundation.

== Publications ==
- Valeska Gert. Tänzerin, Schauspielerin, Kabarettistin. With a foreword by Volker Schlöndorff. Frölich und Kaufmann, Berlin 1985; ISBN 3-88725-196-2
  2nd edition: Hentrich, Berlin 1987; ISBN 3-926175-31-1
- with Hedwig Müller & Garnet Schuldt: Dore Hoyer. Tänzerin. Hentrich, Berlin 1992; ISBN 3-89468-012-1
- Zwischen Ausdruckstanz und Postmodern Dance. Dore Hoyers Beitrag zur Weiterentwicklung des modernen Tanzes in den 1930er Jahren. Dissertation. Freie Universität Berlin 2004 (Online-Zugang).
- Das Berliner Hansaviertel and the Interbau 1957. Sutton, Erfurt 2007; ISBN 978-3-86680-151-6
- (co-author): Musikstadt Köln. Geschichte und Gegenwart. Dohr, Cologne 2013; ISBN 978-3-86846-110-7
- Der Maler/The Painter Ernst Oppler. Berliner Secession & Russisches Ballett/The Berlin Secession & The Russian Ballet. Wienand, Cologne 2017; ISBN 978-3-86832-391-7

Editorship:

- with Susan Au: Documentation beyond performance. Dance scholarship today. Internationales Theaterinstitut, Berlin 1989; ISBN 3-924056-05-6
- Der Tänzer Harald Kreutzberg. Hentrich, Berlin 1997; ISBN 3-89468-109-8
- Birgit Åkesson. Postmoderner Tanz aus Schweden/Postmodern Dance from Sweden. Wienand, Cologne 1998; ISBN 3-87909-627-9
- Tanz & Eros/Dance & Eros, Ausstellungskatalog. Photographs by Dieter Blum. Deutsches Tanzarchiv, Cologne 1998; ISBN 3-980-4523-6-0
- Isadora & Elizabeth Duncan in Deutschland. Wienand, Cologne 2000; ISBN 3-87909-645-7.
- Annelise Löffler, Anneliese Planken, Wilhelm Gorré: Pas de trois. Deutsches Tanzarchiv Köln, Cologne 2001.
- with Rainer Stamm: Die Sacharoffs. Zwei Tänzer aus dem Umkreis des Blauen Reiters. Wienand, Cologne 2002, ISBN 3-87909-792-5.
- Henri Justamant: Giselle ou les Wilis. Ballet fantastique en deux actes. Olms, Hildesheim 2008; ISBN 978-3-487-13830-5
- Die Tanzkritiken von Artur Michel in der Vossischen Zeitung von 1922 bis 1934 nebst einer Bibliographie seiner Theaterkritiken. Lang, Frankfurt, 2015; ISBN 978-3-631-53736-7
- With Thomas Thorausch: „Man ist kühn genug, um unmodern zu sein“. Klaus Geitels Tanzkritiken 1959–1979. Henschel, Leipzig 2019; ISBN 978-3-89487-804-7
- Valeska Gert: Ich bin eine Hexe. Kaleidoskop meines Lebens. Alexander, Berlin 2019; ISBN 978-3-89581-511-9.
- with Yvonne Hardt: Yvonne Georgi. Tagebuch und Dokumente zu Tanztourneen mit Harald Kreutzberg (1929–1931). Eine andere Recherche zu den Potenzialen einer kritischen Nachlassforschung. Wienand, Cologne 2019; ISBN 978-3-86832-542-3

He is for the "Deutsche Tanzarchiv Köln" editor or co-editor of monographs by other authors on Kurt Jooss, Oda Schottmüller, Hanna Berger, Alexander von Swaine, and Gret Palucca, as well as three CD-ROMs.
