= Deutsches Tanzarchiv Köln =

German dance archive

Deutsche Tanzarchiv Köln Tanzmuseum
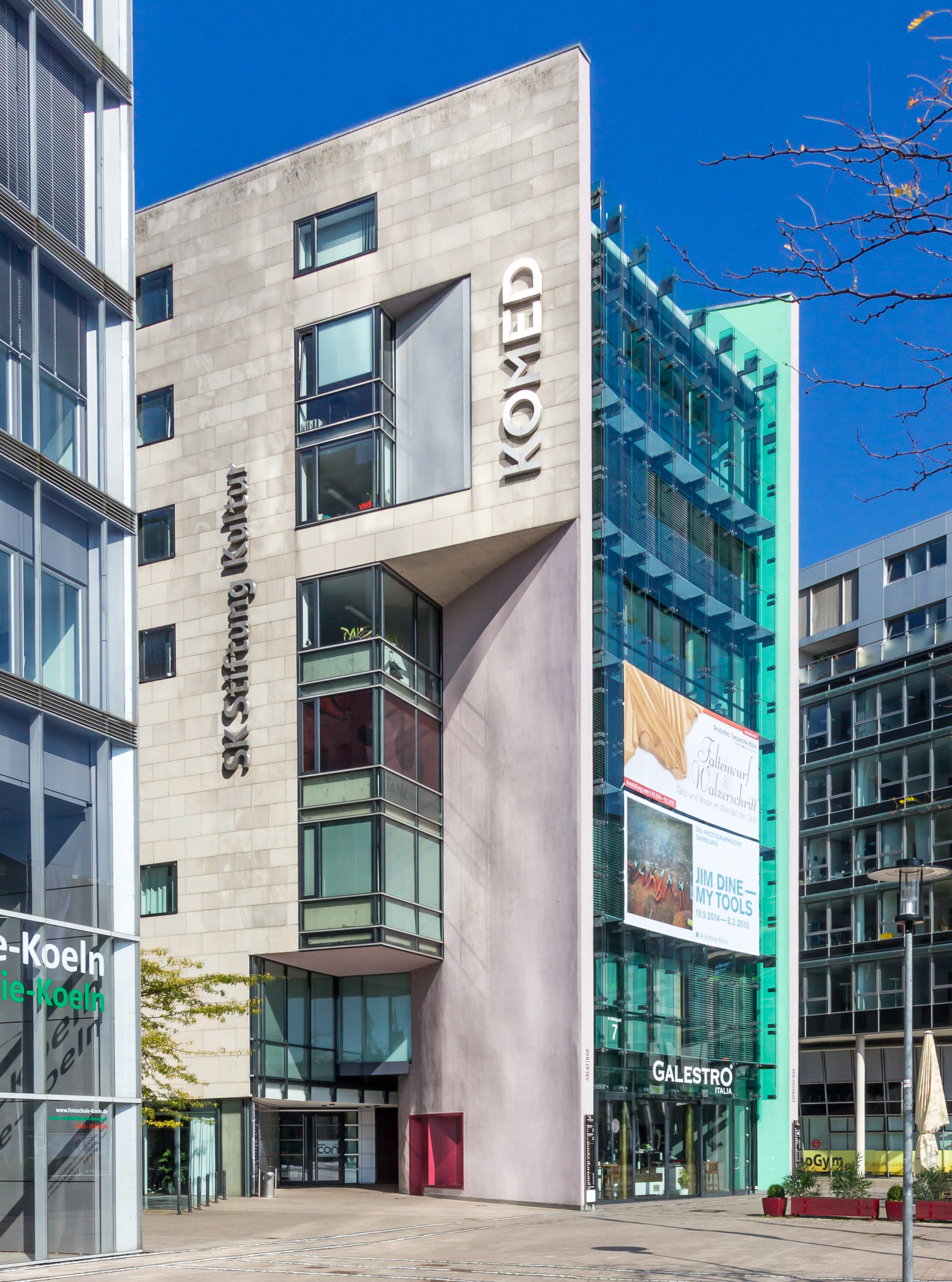
- MediaPark 7 in Cologne, housing the Tanzarchiv, in October 2014
- Established: 1948; 78 years ago (Hamburg)
- Field of research: Dance on stage
- Location: MediaPark, Cologne, North Rhine-Westphalia, Germany; 50°56′56″N 6°56′36″E
- Operating agency: SK Stiftung Kultur; Cologne
- Website: www.deutsches-tanzarchiv.de

The Deutsche Tanzarchiv Köln (German Dance Archive Cologne) is a national information and research centre for concert dance in Germany. It is located in the MediaPark in Cologne, North Rhine-Westphalia, with an archive, library, video library and museum on the history around dance for an audience.

The archive continuously acquires, manages and documents the estates of well-known personalities in dance history, processes them and presents them to the public in exhibitions and publications. The institution's Tanzmuseum (Dance museum), opened in 1997, presents the history of dance under changing thematic aspects, primarily with its own holdings in works of art (sculptures, paintings, graphics), photographs, documents, costumes and films, with a focus on dance history from the 18th to the 20th century.

== Location and supports ==
The Tanzarchiv is housed in Cologne's MediaPark 7. The institution is supported by the SK Stiftung Kultur of the Sparkasse KölnBonn, and by the city of Cologne; since 1986, the Tanzarchiv has been managed by Frank-Manuel Peter, a dance researcher and professor at the Hochschule für Musik und Tanz Köln.

== History ==
The origins of the Tanzarchiv date back to the 19th century. From 1873 onwards, a library and an archive were established at the Akademie der Tanzlehrkunst (Academy of Dance Teaching) in Berlin, for the first time in Germany. It aimed for the systematic documentation of the art of dance, and was continued in the 1930s as the Deutsche Meisterstätten für Tanz (German master places for dance) by Fritz Böhme, financed with public funds. Its extensive holdings were mostly destroyed during World War II in a British air raid on the night of 2 March 1943. Only a collection of 20 scrapbooks was saved because their owner who had deposited them in Berlin had taken them to Switzerland at the beginning of the war. Böhme built up a new collection, which was moved in more than 30 book boxes to Seeberg Castle in the then Reichsgau Sudetenland, Regierungsbezirk Eger, but has since been lost. Only a very small number of books from this second collection were donated by a Czech dance enthusiast and returned to the Tanzarchiv in Cologne.

After World War II, Kurt Peters, a dancer, dance educator and publicist, continued the tradition and rebuilt the archive in a private initiative, first in Hamburg from 1948 as Deutsches Tanzarchiv, and from 1965 in Cologne. These holdings were finally acquired by the SK Stiftung Kultur in 1985 and made accessible to the public.

== Holdings ==
The holdings of the Dance Archive are divided into four departments: archive, library, video library/film collection and museum collection.

=== Archive ===
The archive is divided into three sections: bequests and collections, photo archive and documentation.

The area of bequests and collections includes bequests, partial bequests, preliminary bequests, collections of persons created by close persons such as family members or dance students, as well as thematic special collections. These more than 400 personal archives include, among others, extensive holdings on dancers, choreographers and dance educators such as Isadora, Elizabeth, Anna and Lisa Duncan, Mary Wigman, Harald Kreutzberg, Kurt Jooss, Yvonne Georgi, Dore Hoyer, Vera Skoronel, Birgit Åkesson, Claire Eckstein, Hertha Feist, Lotte Goslar, Niddy Impekoven, Jo Mihaly, Trudi Schoop, Alexander and Clotilde Sacharoff, Leonide Massine, La Jana, Oda Schottmüller, Natascha Trofimowa, Konstanze Vernon and Vivienne Newport, as well as of writers and critics such as Fritz Böhme, Max Niehaus, Georg Zivier and Horst Koegler. The area of thematic special collections includes the archives of associations and organisers, of dance magazines and collections created for special aspects such as poster stamps with dance motifs.

The photo archive section includes a central collection of over 160,000 photos and photographer archives on dance history such as those of Siegfried Enkelmann, Hans Rama, Walter Boje, Fritz Peyer and Annelise Löffler. It also contains holdings of vintage prints by renowned photographers such as Hugo Erfurth, Albert Renger-Patzsch, Arnold Genthe and Germaine Krull.

The documentation section includes about 650,000 newspaper clippings and press releases as well as about 25,000 program books.

=== Library ===
The library contains a reference collection of currently about 13,000 titles on all topics of dance from Germany and abroad, including rare books since the 16th century and numerous dissertations. In addition, about 16,000 specialist journal issues are accessible.

=== Video library/film collection ===
The stock of the reference video library comprises over 6,500 productions (as of 2021) from various categories such as dance films, musicals, documentaries as well as studio and stage recordings. One focus of the collection is on video dance or camera choreographies. Part of the collection is accessible via an online catalogue.

=== Museum collection ===
The collection of works of art related to dance contains a few examples from ancient Greece, as well as sculptures, paintings, several thousand sheets of original graphic art including drawings, copper engravings, lithographs and etchings, several thousand posters, as well as dance masks and about 500 dance costumes. Some costumes are by fashion designers such as Paul Poiret, Fortuny and Madame Grès). Bequests related to dance by visual artists such as Ernst Oppler, Arthur Grunenberg and by Raymond Puccinelli are also part of the collection.

== Publications ==
The Tanzarchiv has published numerous volumes about specific topics of dance history.
