= Fritz Böhme =

German dance publicist and cultural journalist (1881-1952)

Fritz Böhme (10 May 1881 – 19 March 1952) was a German dance publicist and cultural journalist.

== Life and career ==
=== Empire and Weimar Republic ===
Born in Berlin, Böhme studied history, art history and education at the Friedrich-Wilhelms-Universität in Berlin from 1902 to 1905. He earned his living for a while with journalistic work for various newspapers and then studied medieval studies and literary history there from 1910 onwards, among others with Erich Schmidt. Schmidt found him his first permanent position as a "scientific assistant" (a kind of assistant) and archivist at the "Gesellschaft für deutsche Erziehungs- und Schulgeschichte" (Society for German Education and School History). In 1913, Böhme was able to publish a supplementary volume to the edition of Theodor Storm's works. This was followed in 1915 by a biographical study on Ferdinand Röse, the fellow pupil and friend of Emanuel Geibel and Storm.

From 1916, Böhme was head of the feature section of the Deutsche Warschauer Zeitung. Having become aware of new developments in dance through the German Youth Movement and Mensendieck students, he began reporting on dance that had nothing to do with ballet and vaudeville. After the First World War, he endeavoured to establish the genre of serious dance criticism in the press: first in the Berliner Börsen-Courier and in the Libelle, at the time the only German magazine with its own dance section. In 1919, Böhme became feuilleton editor of the Deutsche Allgemeine Zeitung. There, he was able to definitively establish the serious art-critical consideration of stage dance, publishing hundreds of articles on dance topics over the years. By the time he gave up permanent employment in favour of freelance work in 1928, he had also published seven books on dance. Böhme founded or played a leading role in various associations (such as the Berlin Dance Critics Association in 1927), participated in the organisation of the three German dancers' congresses in 1927, 1928 and 1930 and gave a large number of lectures on dance topics. He strove for the scientific study of dance research and published related essays such as Materialien zu einer soziologischen Untersuchung des künstlerischen Tanzes. In the dispute between the followers of Rudolf von Laban and Mary Wigman, which culminated at the second German dancers' congress in Essen in 1928, Böhme took Laban's side. Böhme published mainly about dance and dancers, but also repeatedly on literary or pedagogical topics and wrote film reviews.

=== Time of National Socialism ===
His versatile work in dance also led him into the fields of folk dance, where he became 1st chairman of the "Verband Deutscher Volkstanzkreise". In this capacity, he believed he had to join the NSDAP and the Kampfbund für Deutsche Kultur in 1933. According to his own statement, he wanted to use his active involvement to prevent the destruction of Ausdruckstanz and the ideological capture of the folk dance circles by the National Socialists." Böhme built up a dance archive at the Deutsche Meisterstätten für Tanz in Berlin from the mid-1930s and taught dance history there. His work during the National Socialist era has not yet been thoroughly researched. What is certain is that he initially tried to win over the new politicians for the modern dance of the Weimar Republic, which was in fact under great threat and for which he had continuously campaigned since 1919. To this end, on 8 November 1933, he wrote a letter to the Reichsministerium für Volksaufklärung und Propaganda Joseph Goebbels. The concrete aim of the letter is the attempt to suggest to Goebbels or the Reich Chamber of Culture the creation of a "single chamber for the art of movement and dance". In order to achieve these two goals, Böhme used – obvious in the case of this recipient of the letter – a National Socialist vocabulary that today strongly compromises him, and which has not been demonstrated in this consistency in his work before or since (according to the current state of research). It is striking that Böhme, in order to save the "new German artistic dance", tried to discredit its competitor on the dance stages, the ballet, by using formulations such as "ballet style based on a liberalistic conception of art". Since a "liberalistic conception of art" is much more applicable to expressive dance, it can be assumed that Böhme intended to deceive politicians with this letter and that his own reasons for his intentions are quite plausible. It is at least certain that Böhme did not represent a National Socialist view of modern artistic dance in his critiques, despite occasional formulations typical of the time in this regard. He continued to write factually and positively about modern dancers such as Dore Hoyer, whose dance style was judged negatively by National Socialist critics. – In the 1930s, Böhme no longer published any books on dance, but once again contributed to the new edition of Theodor Storm's works.

=== Post-war period ===
Böhme was severely restricted in the exercise of his previous professional activities due to the total destruction of the dance archive he had directed as a result of the war and a ban on writing for several years until his denazification in 1949. In the last years of his life, he taught dance history at Marianne Vogelsang's private dance school and at the Staatliche Ballettschule in Berlin.

Partial estates of Böhme are in the Tanzarchiv Leipzig and in the Deutsches Tanzarchiv Köln (German Dance Archive Cologne).

== Work ==
- (Bearb.:) Olga Desmond Rhythmographik, Leipzig 1919
- Vom musiklosen Tanz, Leipzig 1921
- with Curt Moreck: Der Tanz in der Kunst, Heilbronn 1924
- Tanzkunst, Dessau 1926
- Der Tanz der Zukunft, Munich 1926
- Entsiegelung der Geheimnisse. Zeichen der Seele. Zur Metaphysik der Bewegung, Berlin 1928
- (Editor:) Die Tänzerin Hilde Strinz. Ein Buch des Gedenkens, Berlin 1928
- Rudolf von Laban und die Entstehung des modernen Tanzdramas. Edition Hentrich, Berlin 1996
