= Kurt Peters =

Kurt Peters may refer to:

- Kurt Peters (chemist)
- Kurt Peters (dancer)
