= Alexander Camaro =

German painter (1901–1992)

- Born: Alphons Bernhard Kamarofski; 27 September 1901; Breslau, Silesia, Germany
- Died: 20 October 1992 (aged 91); Berlin, Germany
- Occupations: Painter; Dancer; Artist-polymath
- Spouse: Renata Gentner (1934–2009)
- Children: Jadwiga Falk-Ley

Alexander Camaro (actual name Alphons Bernhard Kamarofski: 27 September 1901 – 20 October 1992) was a German artist (painter) and dancer.

== Life ==
Alphons Bernhard Kamarofski was born and grew up in Breslau (as Wrocław was known before) 1945). His education included violin lessons and training as an acrobat. While he was still young he joined a circus troupe and performed as a tightrope artist.

Between 1920 and 1925 Camaro studied painting at the Breslau National Academy for Arts and Crafts, where his teachers included Otto Mueller. Later he attended the City Conservatory ("Städtisches konservatorium") in Breslau. During 1929 and 1930 he attended the "Wigman School", an expressionist dance school in Dresden. In 1930 he appeared as a soloist alongside Mary Wigman herself, in Albert Talhoff's elaborate anti-war stage-drama "Totenmal". While Wigman led a line of grieving mothers in pastel-blue veils, Alexander Camaro, as the god of war, wore a face-mask that according to one commentator made him look like a cross between the high-profile heavy-weight boxer Max Schmeling and the pioneering stage director Paul Wegener. "Totenmal" made its mark with audiences, although the demanding requirements of the production led to a deficit on the production of a hundred thousand Marks. During the war years

While attending the "Wigman School", Camaro was undertaking a number of additional engagements as a dancer, using the name "Alexander Kamaroff". One of his dance partners was Gisa Ley. Jadwiga (today Jadwiga Falk-Ley), their daughter, was born in 1930.

Although, given the choice, Camaro later supported himself and expressed himself artistically primarily though his painting, during the twelve Nazi years, the authorities decided his work was "degenerate" and exhibition of his paintings was banned. He survived chiefly through dance. The National Socialists were able to take power in January 1933 and lost no time in transforming Germany into a one-party dictatorship Many things changed, but Camaro was neither Jewish nor a political activist, and was able to pursue a stage career. Liselore Bergmann became his regular dance partner and together they danced in a number venues across Germany, notably at the Residenztheater in Gotha. In 1939, as war broke out nearby, Camaro was dismissed from a position as ballet-master at Allenstein. During the war years Camaro and Bergmann undertook foreign tours in the Netherlands and in France. Later they were sent to give dance performances to entertain the forces on the Russian front and in Crete. In 1944 Camaro received the order to report for military service, so went into hiding for the rest of the war.

After the war Silesia was no longer in Germany so there was no question of going back to Breslau. Almost all his earlier paintings had been destroyed in the bombings. Camaro settled in Berlin where for him 1945 marked the start of a particularly productive phase as an artist. There were several exhibitions during the immediate postwar years and he became well known within Berlin's arts circles. In 1949 he was, with friends, a co-founder of the legendary, surrealistic and short-lived Berlin cabaret group, Die Badewanne (literally, "The Bathtub"). He applied his creative energies to his work as a painter, as a dancer and even as a pantomime artist. He joined the newly re-established Deutscher Künstlerbund ("German artists' association") in 1950 and participated in their first postwar exhibition with four oil paintings, including the large-format "Rosa Dame" ("Pink lady").

Following a comprehensive exhibition of his surviving works to date at the Haus am Waldsee (Berlin-Steglitz-Zehlendorf) in 1951 Camaro received the Berlin Arts Prize ("Berliner Kunstpreis") from the (West) German Academy of Arts. A year later he accepted a professorship in painting at the Berlin University of the Arts. The regular salary gave him a new level of financial security, but also reduced his public profile with art buyers because there was no longer a stream of new Camaro works appearing on the market. The extent to which, after 1952, Camaro became something of a hoarder of his own artwork would only become apparent to commentators after his death, at which point his estate contained well over 800 oil paintings, along with a substantial, collection of graphic art, drawings and sketches.

== Personal ==
Alexander Camaro married Renata Gentner (1934–2009), one of his most brilliant students who came, originally, from Herrenberg (near Stuttgart), in 1966. In 1971 the couple moved to a studio at Kampen on Sylt. After that Alexander Camaro worked alternately on Sylt and in Berlin.

== Work ==
Camaro was a relatively prolific artist. His output includes paintings, graphic pieces, drawings and collages, along with contributions in the worlds of dance and of film. His early works focused, in particular, on themes involving circus, vaudeville and theatre settings. That reflected the world in which he was living and working at the time, but as his career progressed beyond stage performing, those themes nevertheless remained integral to his output, though they were no longer always to the fore.

The image cycle "Das Hölzerne Theater" (The Wooden Theatre) of 1945/46 established Camaro as part of the postwar "Berlin arts scene". It demonstrates his sense of space and perspective, with bold shapes and slanted surfaces set in staggered overlapping compositions. Till the end of the 1940s Camaro's approach was mainly figurative, his paintings communicating a narrative that in part operates below the surface, but which also evokes a melancholy poeticism. In the rather cautious colour selections, shades of brown predominate, off-setting contrasting bright accents.

In the 1950s Camaro's focus switched to more starkly abstract paintings. Sharply delineated forms and symbols with mathematical precision characterise this work. The "Instrumentenbildern" (literally "instrument pictures") of the 1960s took him back to more figurative elements. In his search for a life in harmony with nature, he found in Sylt a special source of inspiration for depictions of natural landscapes and lighting. Bright colours, notably shades of white, dominate the large-format canvases of his later work, in some of which he revives devices from his earlier periods such as collage techniques.

In 1955 Camaro started to receive commissions for public art. Probably the best known example was his collaborative project with his then partner, the ceramics artist Susanne Riée, for a permanent work created from strongly coloured glass blocks at the Berliner Philharmonie (concert hall) (1963). There were further works of the same kind produced for public buildings, now in collaboration with Renata Camaro, notably at the Berlin Public library ("Staatsbibliothek)") (1974/75) and at the Berlin Musical Instrument Museum (1980/81).

== Alexander and Renata Camaro foundation ==
The Alexander and Renata Camaro foundation was founded in Berlin by Renata Camaro in 2009 to manage the couple's artistic legacy, which is made accessible to the public through publications and exhibitions in "Camaro House" and other accessible locations. The foundation also supports contemporary painting, dance, literature, film and music in connection with Alexander Camaro's multi-faceted work.
