= Curt Lahs =

German painter

Curt Lahs (15 January 1893 Düsseldorf - 11 June 1958 in Berlin) was a German painter and arts professor.

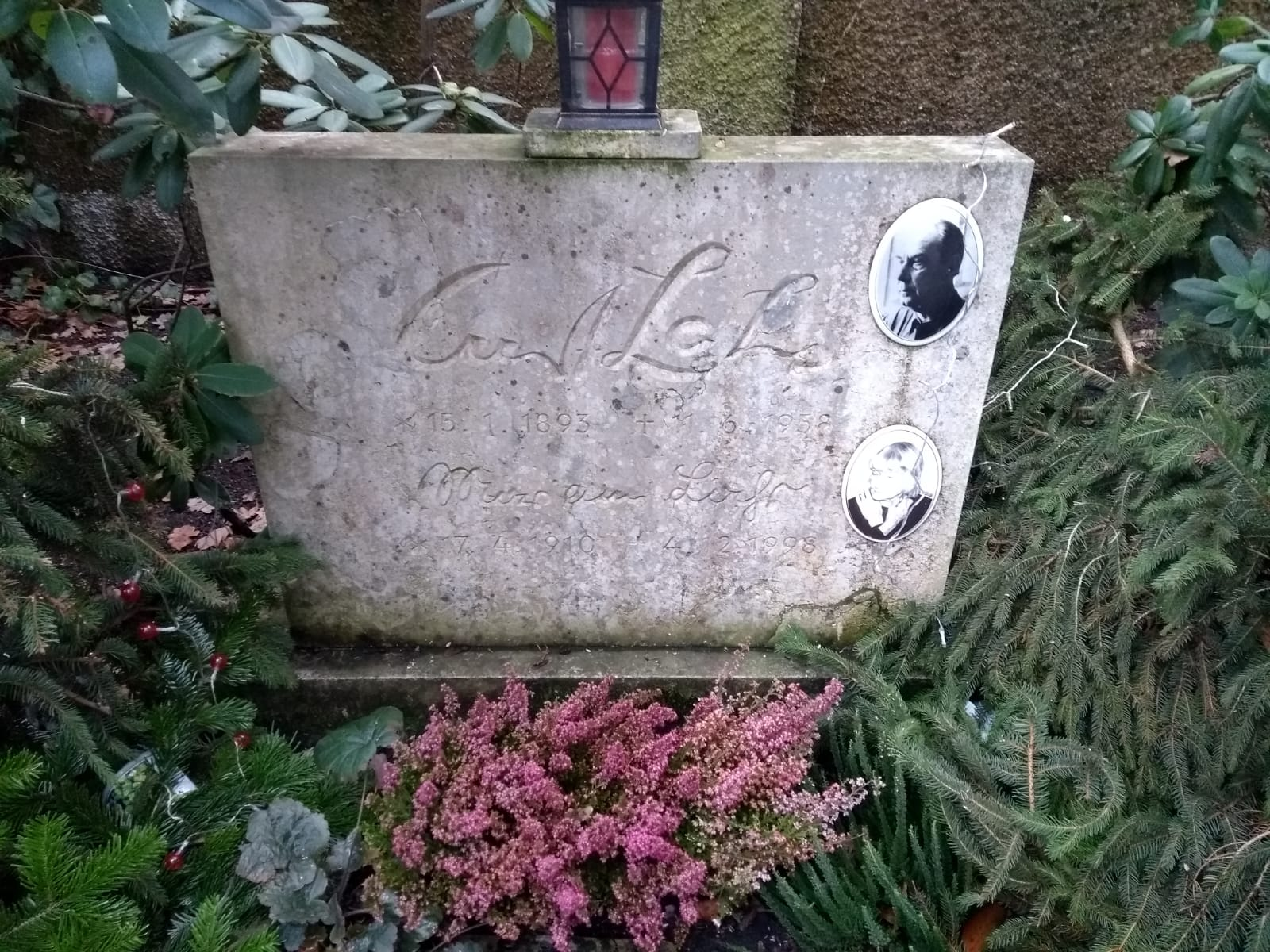
Tombstone from Curt Lahs and his wife at Friedhof Zehlendorf in Berlin

== Timeline ==
He exhibited at Galerie Flechtheim, Düsseldorf in 1919. In 1921, he was a member of the group The Young Rheinländers Exhibition at the home of Mutter Ey.

In 1928 he taught at the Volkskunstschule, Düsseldorf and in 1929 he became director of the Academia de pintura y esculera, Instituto de Bellas Artes, Medellín, Colombia. He returned to Volkskunstschule, Düsseldorf in 1930 but was dismissed from his teaching post by the Nazis, Branded a "Degenerate Artist" in 1933. He spent the years 1933–1943 in travels to and exhibits in France, Jugoslavia and Italy.

In 1943 he was unwillingly drafted into the German Army and the same year captured by American troops and incarcerated. Most of his early work was destroyed when the home in which paintings were stored was burned in a bombing. He was released from prisoner of war camp in 1944.

He continued to work as an independent artist and had exhibits at Galerie Gerd Rosen and Galerie Brenner, Berlin in 1945. In 1947, he gained a post at University in Halle, Germany. In 1948 he began a second position at the Hochschule fur Bildende Künste, Berlin, travelling between jobs by train. In 1949 he left the post at Halle after warnings from colleagues regarding new Communist government threat to him. He was again considered a "degenerate artist", this time by the communists.

He died in his sleep of heart failure at the age of 65.

== Awards ==
- "Stahl und Eisen" Prize for painting, Düsseldorf, Germany. 1952
- Kunspreis from the City of Berlin. 1954

== Bibliography ==
- Galerie Flechtheim. Das Junge Rheinland. Düsseldorf: Galerie Flechtheim, 1919
- Galerie Gerd Rosen. Almanach 1947. Berlin: Galerie Gerd Rosen, 1947.
- Galerie Gerd Rosen. exhibition catalogue. Berlin: Galerie Gerd Rosen, 1947. (with Juro Kubicek, Hannah Höch, and others).
- Max Niehaus. Sardinien, Ein Reisebuch. With Illustrations by Curt Lahs. Frankfurt: Societät, 1938
- Stadtmuseum in der Moritzburg, Halle. Kunstaustellung 1947, Sachsen Anhalt. Malerei/Plastik/Graphik, Halle, 1947
- Berliner Neue Gruppe, Berlin, 1950
- Hochschule für Bildende Künste. Deutscher Künsterbund, Erste Ausstellung, Berlin, 1951
- Various Authors. Schri Kunst Schri 3, Ein Almanach Alter und Neuer Kunst, Baden Baden: Woldemar Klein, 1955.
- Curt Lahs. Freundliche Zeichen. With an introduction by Franz Roh. Silberne Quell Band 49, Baden Baden, Woldemar Klein, 1960.
- Ulrich Krempel. Am Anfang: Das Junge Rheinland. Zur Kunst und Zeitgeschichte einer Region 1918–1945. Klaasen Verlag, 1985.
- Christine Fischer-Defoy. Kunst. Macht. Politik. .Die Nazifizierung der Kunst und Musik Schulen in Berlin. Berlin: Elefanten Press, 1988.
- Galerie Stolz. Schöne Tage im Hause Dexel: Das Gästebuch. (Fine Days at the Dexel's: The Guest Book), Cologne: Galerie Stolz, 1990.
- Curt Lahs, Ari Lahs, Angela Lahs-Gonzales. Curt Lahs : Kubistische Figuration - Konstruktion - Mikrokosmologische Abstraktion. Galerie Bernd Dürr GmbH. Berghild, Pollmann, Bernd Dürr, 1992.
- Markus Krause. Galerie Gerd Rosen: Die Avantgarden in Berlin 1945-1950. Berlin: Ars Nikolai, 1995.
- Dorit Litt and Matthias Rataiczyk. Verfemte Formalisten: Kunst aus Halle (Saale) 1945–1963. Halle (Saale) Kunstverein “talstrasse” e.V., 1998
