= Annelise Löffler =

German photographer (1914–2000)

Annelise Löffler, also Anneliese (22 March 1914 – 21 July 2000) was a German photographer.

== Life and career ==
Born in Münster, Löffler's childhood and youth were overshadowed by two tragic events: her mother died very early and in 1933 also quite unexpectedly her father, Klemens Löffler, the founding director of the Universitäts- und Stadtbibliothek Köln.

In the 1930s, Löffler first worked as a translator; in 1946, she was employed as a laboratory assistant and photographer at the "Bild- und Filmberichterstattung Walter H. Schmitt" in Cologne and made numerous stage recordings during this time. Later she documented the buildings of the Cologne Bauwens company for many years.

In addition to factual and architectural photographs (for example, several series of undersides of prestressed concrete bridges) and a wealth of studies of everyday life, the main focus of her photographic work lies in the field of artistic stage dance. She regularly documented the annual International Summer Academy of Dance in Cologne.

She photographed personalities of the dance world of the time including: Alvin Ailey, Sonia Arova, Gerhard Bohner, Trisha Brown, Christopher Bruce, Nina Corti, Anton Dolin, Louis Falco, Gus Giordano, Tatjana Gsovsky, Melissa Hayden, Rosella Hightower Kurt Jooss, Henning Kronstam, Pearl Lang, Hans van Manen, Matt Mattox, Samy Molcho, George Skibine, Marjorie Tallchief, Glen Tetley, Antony Tudor, José de Udaeta, and Yuriko.

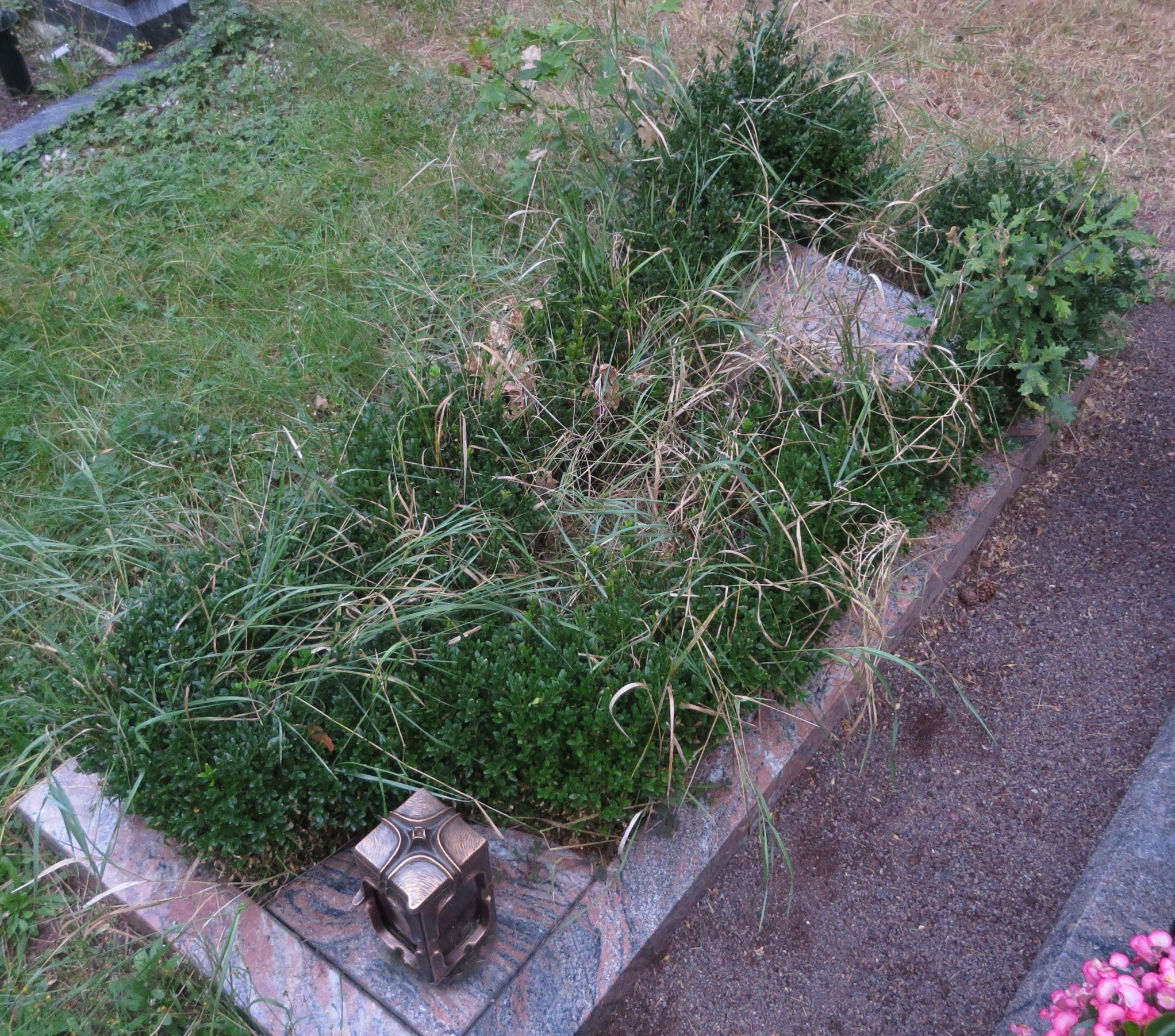
Löffler's grave, Cemetery Melaten (2016)

To this end, she also photographed the choreographic competitions in Cologne, where among others Reinhild Hoffmann, Susanne Linke, Krisztina Horvath, Marilén Breuker, Eiko and Koma and James Saunders presented their early(ste)n own choreographies to the public.

Löffler photographed the performances of the Cologne Dance Forum, various guest performances of international companies in Cologne, furthermore on her travels local stage dance ensembles in London, The Hague, Nancy or Basel, the annual Essen Dance Award ceremonies, the conferences of the Deutsche Akademie des Tanzes etc. and for many years the lessons and performances of the children's dance classes of the German children's dance teacher Gisela Peters-Rohse. Countless reprints in specialist books, dance magazines and ballet calendars attest to her work.

== Death and legacy ==
Löffler died in Cologne in 2000 at the age of 86 and was buried in Cologne's Melaten Cemetery (Corridor 10 (T)). Her dance-related estate is in the Deutsches Tanzarchiv Köln.
