= Claire Eckstein =

German dancer and choreographer

Claire (Cläre) Eckstein (8 July 1904 – 25 September 1994) was a German modern dancer and choreographer.

== Life ==
Born in Allendorf (Hesse) the daughter of a Protestant pastor, Eckstein received her early training at Lucy Heyer's school of rhythmic gymnastics in Munich from 1921 to 1923 and then moved to Mary Wigman's school in Dresden until 1924. This was followed by performances at the Festspielhaus Hellerau.

In 1925, Eckstein was appointed to the Mainfranken Theater Würzburg as movement director, solo dancer and head of the rhythmic courses for the entire staff. This led to her first successful productions and choreographies of her own: The Demon, The Lyrebox and Scheherazade. At the same time as Eckstein, the director Arthur Maria Rabenalt and the set designer Wilhelm Reinking were appointed to the theatre. It was the beginning of a congenial collaboration and lifelong friendship. In 1927 she married Reinking.

In 1927, all three moved to the Hessian Staatstheater Darmstadt, where Eckstein was dance director (later: dance mistress) and head of the physical training courses. Under the artistic director Carl Ebert, this stage became one of the most progressive German theatres of its time through the Rabenalt-Reinking-Eckstein team (also jokingly dubbed "Rabenkingstein AG").

Eckstein's own productions and choreographies, in addition to his other collaborations, include Oben und Unten to the Rapsodie nègre by Francis Poulenc, Der Leierkasten, Poor Guerino by Tullo Massarani (premiere), Le bœuf sur le toit, Parade, The Wedding in Cremona, Soirée, A Higher Official and The Stranded. With Soirée, Eckstein played a major role in the German Dance Week for the 3rd German Dancers Congress in Munich. Her stage partner became Edwin Orr Denby.

Eventually, the Reich capital also engaged the trio, namely the Theater am Schiffbauerdamm and the Volksbühne Berlin. Here the tried and tested concept of theatre, operetta, opera was implemented with great success for the big city audience with dances in The Regimental Daughter and The Grand Duchess of Gerolstein. In addition to choreographic work for film, Claire Eckstein received engagements in Werner Finck's Die Katakombe and in the Wintergarten. Autumn 1932 saw a two-month guest appearance with Edwin Denby for Erik Charell in Paris with The White Horse Inn and in January they were both in the opening programme of Erika Mann's Munich cabaret Die Pfeffermühle. After this work, Denby left Germany for political reasons and returned to his homeland, the United States.

When public pressure forced the Arbeitsgemeinschaft to disband, Claire Eckstein moved to Munich in 1936. During this time, she fell ill with multiple sclerosis and only worked occasionally, for example in an advisory capacity on the film Anuschka.

She remained connected to this advisory activity after the war, including rehearsing the dances for the German premiere of La Folle de Chaillot (Munich Kammerspiele), working on the films Zarewitsch and Zigeunerbaron and as dance director of the film junior department of Bavaria Film.

Eckstein died in Munich at the age of 90.

== Appreciation ==
Eckstein's work was very "innovative", and many of the theatrical devices she used have only been rediscovered for dance decades later (and certainly in ignorance of her works).

"She does not dance 'Weltanschauung' like Mary Wigman, but serenity par excellence. If one could say of Mary Wigman that she dances Stefan George, one could say of Eckstein that she dances Tucholsky and Joachim Ringelnatz [...]", writes Hans Sahl in his Memoirs of a Moralist. Memoirs I. Zurich 1983, p. 194. "Eckstein is enchanting because one never for a moment forgets that she enjoys making fun, which, as we know, is punishable by death in Germany."

Eckstein did not want to affect, she wanted to entertain the audience, and she did so at a high level certified by all sides.

== Performances ==
- 20 March 1926: Paul Hindemith Der Dämon, Stadttheater Würzburg
- 5 March 1927: Jaap Kool Der Leierkasten, Stadttheater Würzburg
- 20 Cktober 1927: Poulenc Oben und Unter, Landestheater Darmstadt
- 20 November 1928: Massarani Der arme Guerino, Landestheater Darmstadt
- 20 November 1928: Darius Milhaud Le bœuf sur le toit, Landestheater Darmstadt
- 30 November 1929: Michail Iwanowitsch Glinka Die Hochzeit in Cremona, Landestheater Darmstadt
- 11 February 1930: Eckstein Soirée, Landestheater Darmstadt
- 20 June 1930: F. Schmitt Ein höherer Beamter, Landestheater Darmstadt
- 20 Junie 1930: Eckstein Die Gestrandeten, Landestheater Darmstadt

Responsible for ballet in

- 20 December 1930: Gaetano Donizetti's La Fille du Régiment, Theater am Schiffbauerdamm, Berlin
- 12 December 1931: Jacques Offenbach's La Grande-Duchesse de Gérolstein, Volksbühne, Berlin
