= Sonia Revid =

Australian dancer

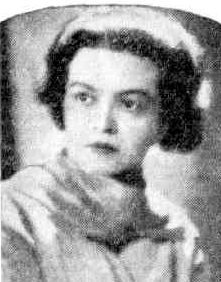
- Sonia Revid, from a 1932 Australian newspaper.
- Born: 9 May 1902; Riga, Latvia
- Died: 1945 (aged 42–43); Melbourne, Australia
- Occupation: Dancer

Sonia Revid (23 Jan 1902 – 8 Aug 1947) was a dancer born in Riga, and based in Melbourne for much of her career.

== Early life ==
Sonia Revid was born in Riga to a Jewish family and lived in Saint Petersburg until she moved to Berlin in 1921. She studied modern dance in Dresden with Mary Wigman.

== Career ==
Revid visited relatives in Melbourne in 1932, and stayed to give dance performances and teach dance at her own studio, the Sonia Revid School of Modern Art Dance, later known as the Sonia Revid School of Art, Dance, and Body Culture, the latter name reflecting her shift towards dance as a public health project. One of her students was Australian dancer and choreographer Louise Lightfoot. She spent a year teaching and performing in Auckland, New Zealand, in 1938 and 1939, under the auspices of the Young Women's Christian Association (YWCA).

Revid took an interest how dance might improved the lives of needy children in Melbourne, and offered free dance and health classes to children in the Fitzroy neighborhood. She gave benefit recitals, and published a pamphlet about her ideas on the subject, "Do Slum Children Distinguish Light From Dark?" She created a didactic dance programme on oral hygiene, titled Little Fool and Her Adventures, with music by Gounod and Saint-Saëns. She created another topical dance piece, The Bushfire Drama (1940), referencing the severe bushfire season of 1939 in Victoria.

== Personal life ==
Revid died in 1945, aged 43 years, in Melbourne. Her papers are archived at the State Library Victoria.
