= Expressionist dance =

Form of dance focused on expression of feelings

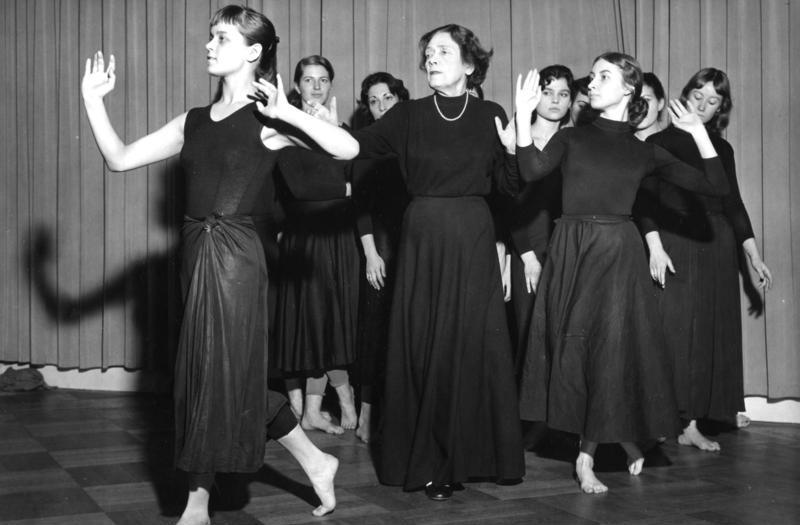
Mary Wigman (centre), a pioneer of expressionist dance, with students at her Berlin dance studio, 1959.

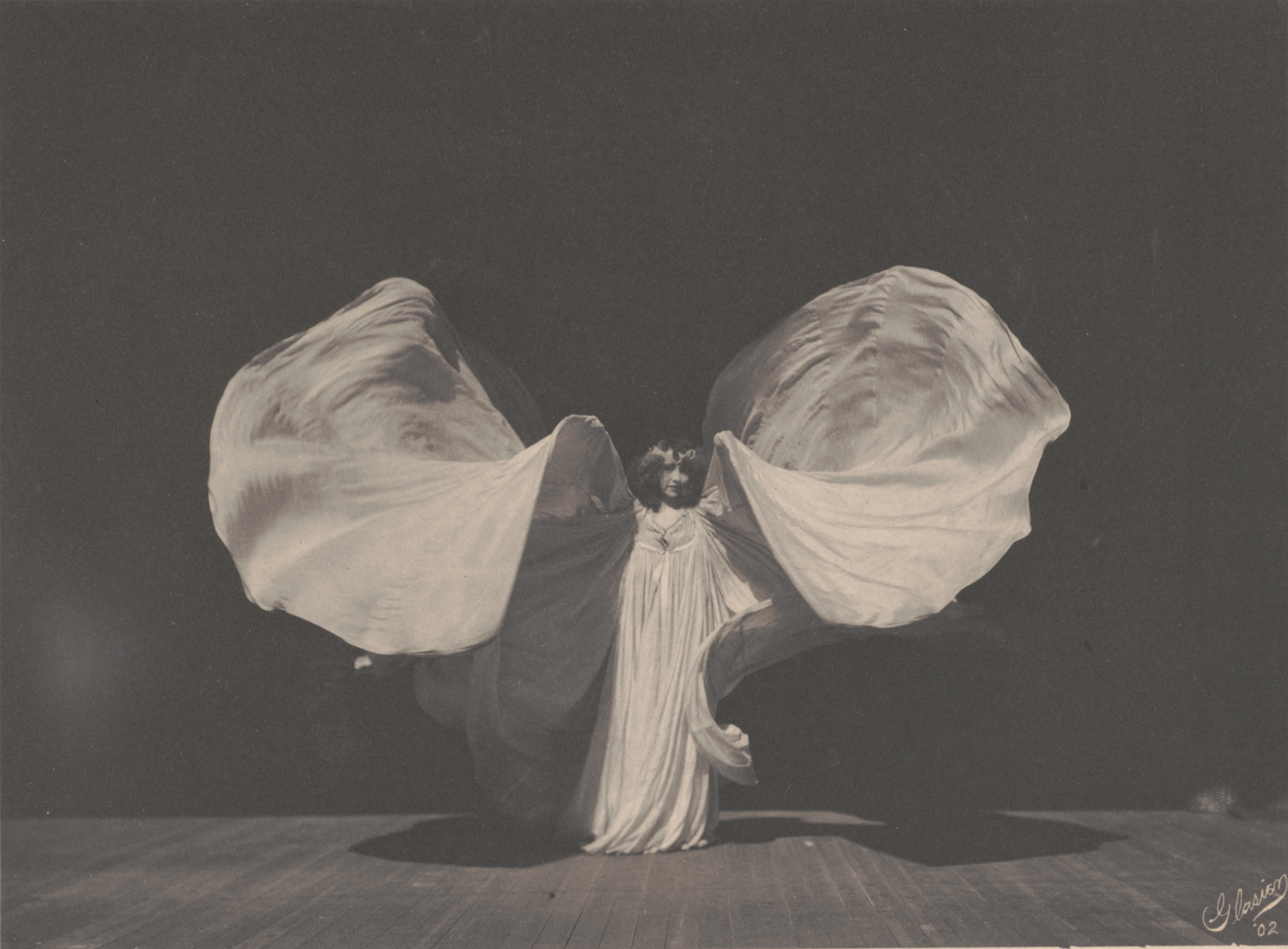
Loie Fuller 1902.

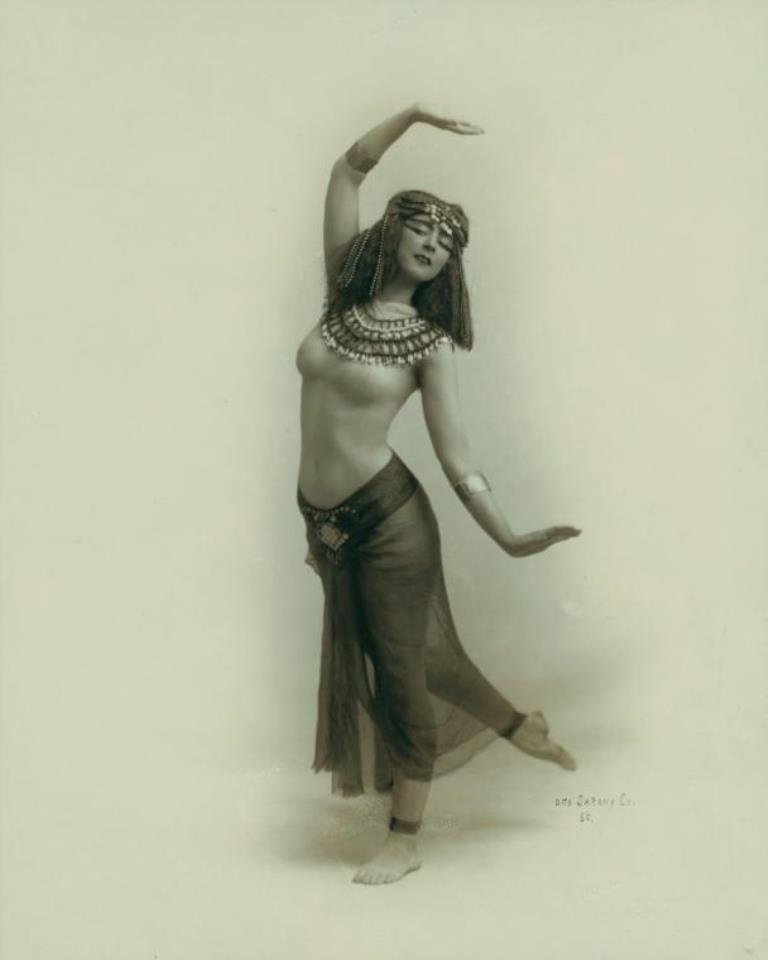
Ruth St. Denis, the ancient Egyptian, 1910.

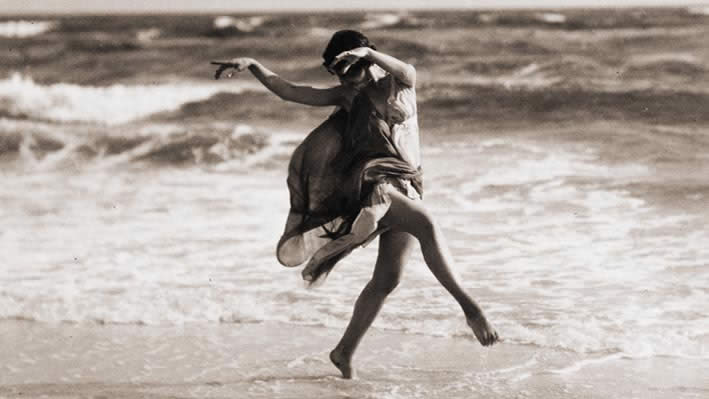
Isadora Duncan at the sea front 1915.

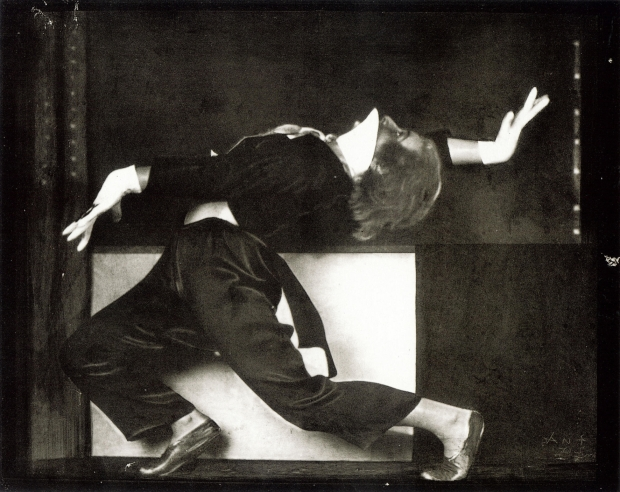
Hilde Holger 1926.

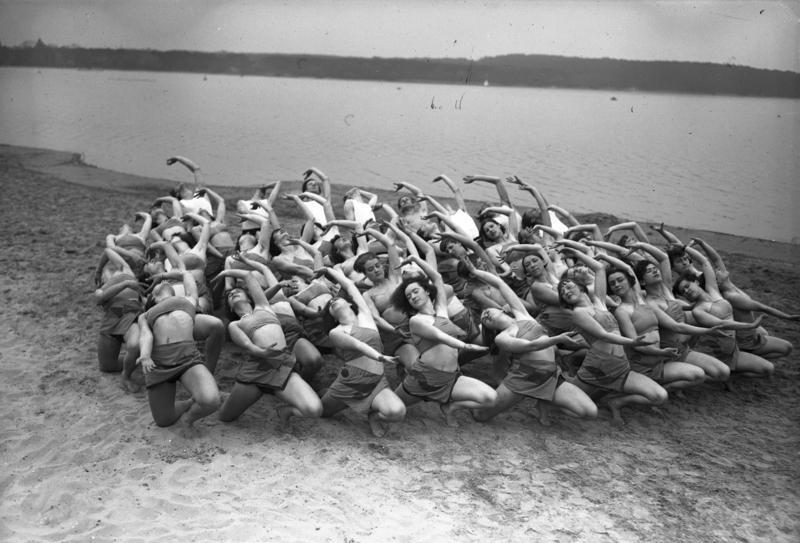
Dance students from Rudolf von Laban's dance school 1930.

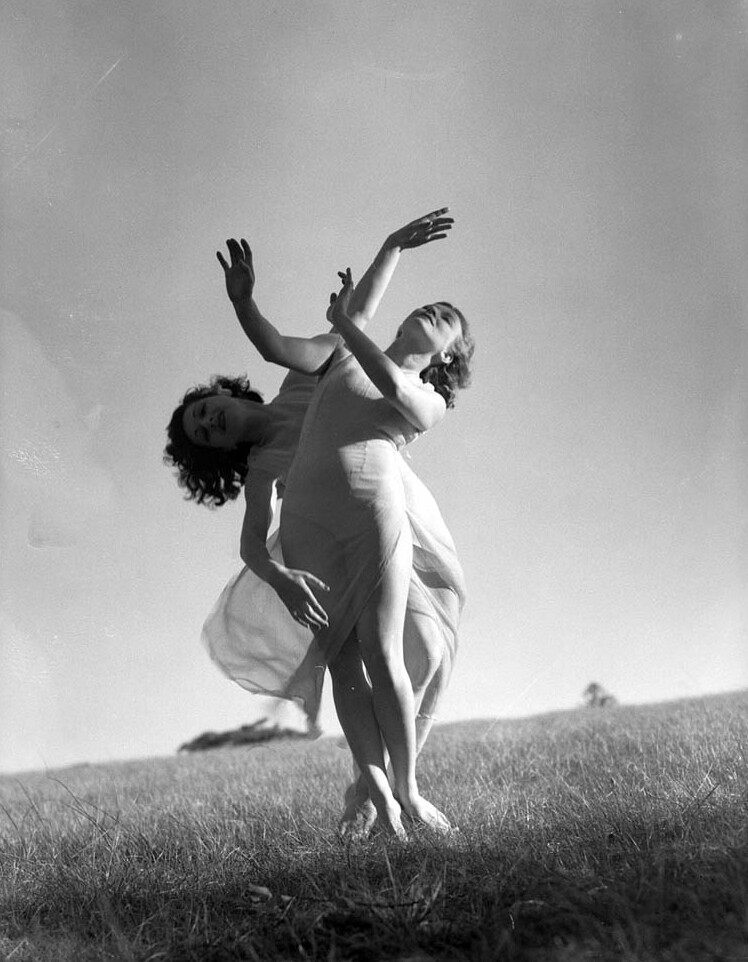
Emmy Towsey (Taussig) and Evelyn Ippen, Bodenwieser Ballet in Centennial Park in Sydney, Australia ca. 1939.

Expressive dance from German Ausdruckstanz, is a form of artistic dance in which the individual and artistic presentation (and sometimes also processing) of feelings is an essential part. It emerged as a counter-movement to classical ballet at the beginning of the 20th century in Europe. Traditional ballet was perceived as austere, mechanical and tightly held in fixed and conventional forms. Other designations are modern dance and (especially in the historical context) free dance, expressionist dance or new artistic dance, in Anglo-American countries German dance. In 2014, modern dance with the stylistic forms and mediation forms of rhythmic and expressive dance movements was included in the German List of intangible Cultural Heritage as defined by the UNESCO Convention for the Safeguarding of Intangible Cultural Heritage. German Expressionist dance is related to Tanztheater.

== History ==
Expressionist dance was marked by the passage of modernism, vitalism, expressionism, avant-garde and a general protest against artistic stagnation and the old society. Ballet was perceived to have been superficial entertainment. The new dance would be art, both individual and artistic creation. The dance was described as the art of movement.

It was a revolution. It would be more expressive, and show more spirit and emotion and less virtuosity. The dance would be improvisational, uninhibited and provocative. Future spiritual and bodily reform movements expressed themselves in a new "natural" naked dance. The women took centre stage. A key protagonist was Isadora Duncan, who around 1900 had taken from classical dance technique and costume. She had even taken off dancing shoes – "you do not play the piano with gloves on". She wanted to unite the body, mind and spirit in her art, and searched with Olga Desmond for inspiration in ancient Greek and Egyptian art, during the time of Orientalism.

The revolutionary movements in Germany and the USA were most obvious, two countries that had no older rooted ballet tradition. The forerunners in Europe included Clotilde von Derp, Hertha Feist, Hilde Holger, Loie Fuller, Jo Mihaly and especially Mary Wigman.

Schools for expressionist dance had special philosophies and emphases for dance, such as naturalness, breathing, tension / relaxation etc. It was often associated with floor contact, "weight" of dance movements, and experiments with music. Body and physicality were strongly emphasized. Rudolf von Laban was a theoretical prominent figure who was based on metaphysical ideas and one of the pioneers of Ausdruckstanz in Germany. From 1913-1918, Laban operated a school for art on the colony Monte Verità in Ascona, Switzerland, which became a teaching centre for the new dance. Among his students were Kurt Jooss and Mary Wigman.

Mary Wigman was an important trendsetter as a dancer, choreographer and teacher. In her school in Dresden (opened in 1920) she taught Europe's premier aspiring dancers Gret Palucca, Harald Kreutzberg, Jeanna Falk, Dore Hoyer and Yvonne Georgi. Hanya Holm brought her theories to the United States, while Birgit Åkesson went her own way with her dance research.

The Denishawn School in the United States was founded by Ruth St. Denis and Ted Shawn, with such students as Martha Graham and Doris Humphrey. Its independent and pioneering dance came to form the backbone of modern dance, whose many branches stretched forth up until today.

Butoh is inspired by the German expressionist dance of the 1950s.

The British choreographer and live performer Liz Aggiss, who trained with Hanya Holm and Hilde Holger, has been making expressionist dance works since 1986. Her first solo show, Grotesque Dancer, was inspired by Valeska Gert. In 1992, Holger revived four dances for Aggiss from her repertoire: Die Forelle (The Trout) (1923), Le Martyre de San Sebastien (1923), Mechaniches Ballett (1926) and Golem (1937). These were first performed with Billy Cowie, as Vier Tanze, at the Manchester Festival of Expressionism in 1992. Sophie Constanti wrote that 'Together all four pieces danced with great sensitivity and aplomb by Aggiss...provided a fascinating insight into the lost Ausdruckstanz of central Europe.'

Indian dancer Patruni Sastry has been working on choreographic style "Indian expressionism" where the major work is focused on queer rights and other social elements

== Literature ==
- Bergsohn, H. and Partsch-Bergsohn, I. (2003) The Makers of Modern Dance in Germany: Rudolf Laban, Mary Wigman, Kurt Jooss. Independent Publishers Group. ISBN 0-87127-250-4
- Robinson, J. (1998) Modern Dance in France, 1920-1970: An Adventure. Routledge. ISBN 90-5702-015-7
- Vernon-Warren, B. and Warren, C. (Eds) (1999) Gertrud Bodenwieser and Vienna's Contribution to Ausdruckstanz. Routledge. ISBN 90-5755-035-0
- Kolb, A. (2009). Performing Femininity: Dance and Literature in German Modernism. Oxford: Peter Lang. ISBN 978-3-03911-351-4
- Amelie Soyka (Hrsg.): Tanzen und tanzen und nichts als tanzen. Tänzerinnen der Moderne von Josephine Baker bis Mary Wigman. Aviva, Berlin 2004. ISBN 3-932338-22-7
- Hermann und Marianne Aubel: Der Künstlerische Tanz unserer Zeit. Die Blauen Bücher. K. R. Langewiesche, Leipzig 1928, 1935; Neudruck der Erstausgabe nebst Materialien zur Editionsgeschichte. Einführender Essay von Frank-Manuel Peter. Published by the Albertina Wien. Langewiesche, Königstein i. Ts. 2002. ISBN 3-7845-3450-3
- Silke Garms: TanzBalance. Ausdruckstanz für Frauen. Rosenholz, Kiel/Berlin 1999. ISBN 978-3-931665-01-2
- Silke Garms: Tanzfrauen in der Avantgarde. Lebenspolitik und choreographische Entwicklung in acht Porträts. Rosenholz, Kiel/Berlin 1998. ISBN 3-931665-11-9/ ISBN 978-3-931665-11-1
- Hedwig Müller: Die Begründung des Ausdruckstanzes durch Mary Wigman. Köln, Phil.Diss. 1986
- Hedwig Müller: Mary Wigman. Leben und Werk der großen Tänzerin. Hrsg. von der Akademie der Künste Berlin. Beltz/Quadriga, Weinheim/Berlin 1992. ISBN 3-88679-148-3
- Hedwig Müller, Frank-Manuel Peter, Garnet Schuldt: Dore Hoyer. Tänzerin. Hentrich, Berlin 1992. ISBN 3-89468-012-1
