= Samy Molcho =

Israeli mime artist

Samy Molcho (Hebrew: סמי מולכו; born 24 May 1936) is an Israeli mime and an expert in body language communication. He was professor at the University of Music and Performing Arts and at Max Reinhardt Seminar in Vienna, Austria until 2004.

He studied dance and mime in Israel. From 1952 he was a dancer at the city theatre of Jerusalem. In 1956 he became a solo dancer (modern dance) in Tel Aviv. In 1960 his first mime performance took place, doing his last tour as a mime in 1987. Since then he has been concentrating on body language communication, publishing several books and has held many workshops. He is a practitioner and exponent of the Barrault-Marceau classical style of mime.

He is now a citizen of Austria. He has been married since 1978 and has four sons.

== Biography ==
Samy Molcho, born in 1936 in Tel Aviv, has added purely psychological and dramatic elements to the art of mime. As a delegate in a cultural exchange, he successfully represented Austria in many countries. Since 1978, he has been married to Haya Heinrich. He has four sons, Nuriel, Elior, Ilan and Nadiv. Since 1980, Samy Molcho has been teaching at the International Summer Academy for Mime, as well as the techniques of mime in Israel. He graduated from an actor's school as well as from a seminar for directors and drama, and was, from 1952, a dancer at the Jerusalem Dance Theatre of Rina Nikowa. From 1956, he was a solo dancer for modern dance in Tel Aviv.

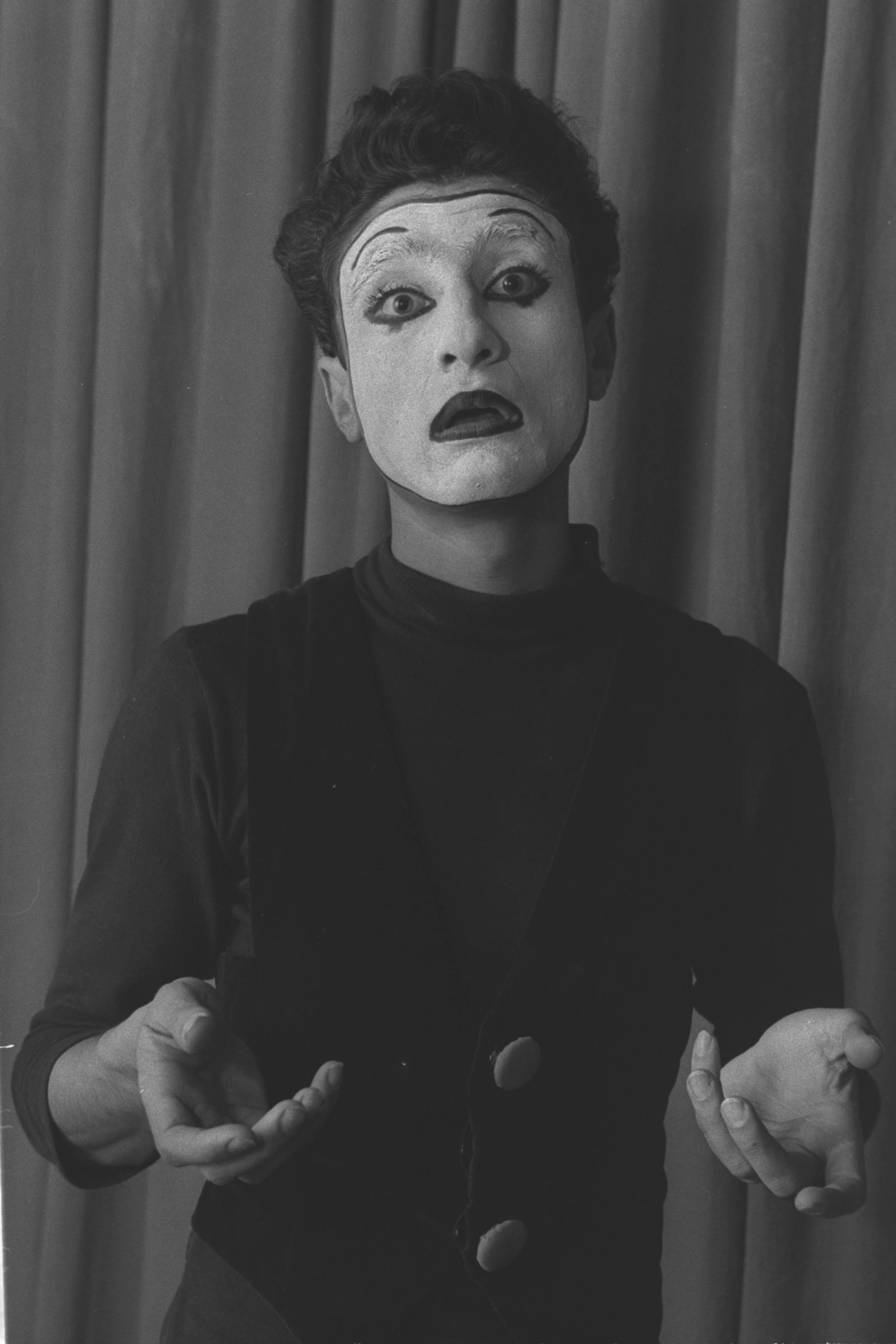
Samy Molcho as a young Israeli mime artist, 1960

He worked as an actor at the Cameri Theatre and at the Israeli National Theatre Habimah. In 1960, he had his first one-man mime performance in Tel Aviv.

Samy Molcho has performed in theatres all over the world, including the Piccolo Teatro in Milano, Akademietheater in Vienna, Royal Opera in Stockholm, Schiller Theatre in Berlin, Royal Court in London, Royal Schouwburg in Amsterdam, Civic Theatre in Johannesburg, Palacio de Bellas Artes in Mexico, Queen Elizabeth Playhouse in Vancouver and the Schauspielhaus in Zurich.

Since that time he has performed in over 50 countries on four continents. He was invited to perform at festivals like the Holland-Festival, Viennese Festival, Spoleto, the festival weeks of Zurich, the Israel Festival for Music and Drama and others.

Samy Molcho created the first Mimo-vision for the Austrian TV, which was awarded the first prize at the International TV Festival in Prague (1964).

== Work ==
In the early 1960s, Molcho began expanding his work beyond performance. In 1963, he choreographed the ballet "Berschit" (At the Beginning) for the German Ballet-Ensemble, which was subsequently recorded for German television following an international tour. The following year, he directed the German world premiere of Jean Genet's "The Negroes" and choreographed the motion for H. Zusaneck's "World Theatre", staged in Vienna on the occasion of the 75th anniversary of the Burgtheater.

In 1965, Molcho created a second Mimo-Vision as Austria's contribution for the Golden Rose of Montreux, in which he played 37 characters in the "Do-It-Yourself-Show". UNESCO subsequently commissioned a thesis from him on the subject of Mimo-vision, which became the theme of the International Congress of Mime and Dance on TV in Salzburg. His directing work through the late 1960s and 1970s included productions of Ionesco's "The Chairs", Gogol's "The Gamblers", Kishon's "Wedding Certificate", and Beckett's "Waiting for Godot" in Bremen, as well as the musical "Godspell" for productions in Germany and Switzerland. In 1973, he collaborated with Ronconi on choreography and direction of "The Birds" at the Wiener Burgtheater.

From 1976 onward he directed several works by Goldoni, including "Servant of Two Masters" at the Festival in Friesach and the Stadttheater Aachen, and "Venetian Twins" at the Ensemble Theatre in Vienna. In 1977, he was appointed to a teaching position at the Academy of Music and Acting at the Max-Reinhardt-Seminar in Vienna and founded his own school for mimes there. In 1978, he directed the world premiere of Arik Brauer's musical "Seven at One Blow" during the Viennese Festival Weeks.

In 1980, he produced the Baroque Festival at the court of Max II Emanuel for the 800th anniversary of the House of Wittelsbach, including "I Trionfi di Baviera" at the Alte Residenztheater and the Cuvilliestheater in Munich. That same year he began delivering body language lectures and seminars internationally, including at the European Management Symposium in Davos and as guest lecturer at the Austrian Diplomatic Academy.

His later directing credits include Mozart's "The Gardener for Love" in Hagen (1983), Schnitzler's mime "The Veil of Pirette" for the Biennale in Venice (1984), and Brecht's "Caucasian Chalk Circle" at the Landesbühne in Wilhelmshafen (1985), for which he received the first prize for directing. He participated in the 1986 television co-production "A Long, Silent Way", a German-Czech documentary on classical mime featuring Marcel Marceau, Ladislav Fialka, and Jean-Louis Barrault. His farewell mime tour in 1987 covered Liechtenstein, Switzerland, Germany, Israel, and Austria. In 2006, he was inducted into the German Speakers Hall of Fame.

== Publications ==
- 1983: Body Language ( MOSAIK)
- 1988: Body Language as Dialogue and Magic of Silence (MOSAIK)
- 1990: Partnership and Body Language (MOSAIK)
- 1992: Body Language of Children (MOSAIK)
- 1995: All about Body-Language (MOSAIK)
- 2003: Body Language of Celebrities (Random House/Bertelsmann, Munich)
- 2005: Body Language of Success and Body Language of Children (Ariston, Munich)
- 2007: Samy Molcho ...And A Drop of Eternity (Amalthea, Vienna)
- 2008: The 1 x1 of Body Language of Children (Heinrich Hugendubel, Kreuzlingen/Munich)
- 2009: Embrace me, but do not touch me – Body language of relationships of nearness and distance (Ariston, Munich)

== Decorations and awards ==
- 1987: Silver Medal for Service to the City of Vienna
- 1996: Austrian Cross of Honour for Science and Art, 1st class
- 2004: Grand Decoration of Honour in Silver for Services to the Republic of Austria
- 2006: Entry into the German Speakers Hall of Fame
- 2008: IIR Excellence Award
- 2008: Golden Medal of Honour for Services to the City of Vienna
