= Siegfried Enkelmann =

German photographer

Siegfried Enkelmann (24 December 1905 – 10 January 1978) was a German photographer in the middle of the 20th century.

== Life and work ==
Born in Krasnopol Belarus, according to his own statement, Enkelmann came to Berlin in 1921. He worked from 1927 to 1929 as an assistant in the photo studio of F. H. Nolte - which specialised in advertising photos - and was then an employee in the studio of Hans Robertson. tHere he worked mainly in the field of dance photography and as a portrait photographer. When Robertson was preparing his emigration, he transferred his studio with his name and his negative archive to Enkelmann. This also contained the stock previously obtained by Robertson with the takeover of the studio of Lili Baruch. Enkelmann continued to work under Robertson's name for a short time before continuing the studio under his own name, presumably due to the time situation. There are dance photographs from the time before 1934 that were first stamped by Lili Altschul-Baruch, then by Robertson, and those that first name the Robertson studio, later S. Enkelmann as the author, whereby the latter may well have been taken by Enkelmann as an employee in the Robertson studio. Almost all of the glass plate negatives that Enkelmann had moved to an arbour in the outskirts of Berlin in order to save them from the destruction of Berlin during the war were wantonly destroyed by Soviet troops in the course of their advance on Berlin. Enkelmann lived with Irene Krämer, a photographer trained by Robertson; they were not able to marry until 1945. In 1960, the Enkelmanns moved from Berlin to Munich.

S. Enkelmann is considered the most prominent German dance photographer from the 1930s to the early 1960s. Countless of his photographs have been published in books and magazines. He himself published several dance photo books with his own photos. According to his own statement, however, he earned his living mainly with advertising photography.

== Photo archive ==
The holdings of Enkelmann's photo archive were acquired by the Deutsches Tanzarchiv Köln. They include a small number of glass plate negatives as well as over 30,000 medium format film negatives from the 1930s, 35mm negatives and slides from the post-war period. The copyrights are held by the Verwertungsgesellschaft Bild-Kunst.
