= Kurt Peters (dancer) =

German dancer, dance educator, dance critic, dance historian and publisher

Kurt Peters (10 August 1915 – 2 February 1996) was a German dancer, dance educator, dance critic, dance historian and publisher. In 1948, he founded the Deutsches Tanzarchiv Köln.

== Life ==
Born in Hamburg, Peters received his professional training in the school for classical dance by Mariska Rudolph, Hamburg (former ballet master at the Deutsches Schauspielhaus), Hungarian Court Opera Budapest, in the opera ballet school of Alexandra Fedorowna-Fokine (Opera Nationale Riga; formerly: Imperial Theatre of Petersburg), in the Laban school in Hamburg (director: Albrecht Knust) and in the school for acrobatics and tap dance of Donald Winclair (USA/Hamburg).

He was a dancer at the Hamburg State Opera (then City Theatre) and in Aachen; solo dancer and assistant ballet master in Saarbrücken; training master and choreographer of travelling variété stages (for dance artistry and classical dance); training master in step and acrobatics for members of the Copenhagen Pantomime Theatre.

Military service from 1939 to 1945 (as a lance corporal) with a shot in the stomach, foot injuries and imprisonment ended his career as a theatre dancer. From 1946, he was a teacher in Hamburg, from 1965 to 1979 a lecturer and co-director, later director of the Cologne Institute for Stage Dance of the Hochschule für Musik und Tanz Köln and Rheinische Musikschule, where he also taught Kinetographie Laban and expanded the Pedagogical Seminar. In 1953, he founded the journal "Das Tanzarchiv" (in 1981 united with "Ballett Journal", since 2003 merged with "tanzdrama" in "Tanz-Journal"). He also founded numerous associations in the field of dance, such as the "Gesellschaft der Freunde der Tanzkunst" (Society of the Friends of the Art of Dance) in 1953 (from whose NRW section the later International Summer Academy of Dance emerged under the direction of Heinz Laurenzen), and finally the Deutsche Akademie des Tanzes (German Academy of Dance) in 1987. He was married to Gisela Peters-Rohse from 1967.

Peters founded the private dance archive in 1948, which was taken over by the SK Stiftung Kultur in 1986 as the Deutsches Tanzarchiv Köln.

He died in Cologne in 1996 at the age of 80 and was buried in Haddorf.

== Awards ==
- Preis für künstlerisches Volksschaffen I. classe der GDR, 1957 (as a citizen of Germany)
- Deutscher Tanzpreis 1984
- Order of Merit of the Federal Republic of Germany 1987
- Honorary member (Honorary President) of the Deutsche Akademie des Tanzes, Cologne, 1994

== Publications ==
Main publication:

- Kurt Peters: Lexikon der klassischen Tanztechnik. Eine systematische Terminologie der klassischen Tanzkunst. Hamburg 1961. 2nd edition. Wilhelmshaven 1991

Other monographic works:

- Abraxas. Hamburg 1964
- Lola Rogge - eine Insel der musischen Tanzkultur. Hamburg 1964
- Dore Hoyer Hamburg 1964
- Kinetographisches Lexikon der klassischen Tanztechnik. Hamburg 1965
- Ballett – Königliche Spiele in Herrenhausen. Cologne 1966
- 10 Jahre Internationale Sommerakademie des Tanzes. Cologne 1966
- Ballet at the Hessian State Theatre Wiesbaden. Cologne 1968
- Enchainements of classical dance in kinetograms. Cologne 1968
- Kurt Peters et al.: Dance History. In four concise compendia. Wilhelmshaven 1991

Peters has written hundreds of articles in professional journals (including as a correspondent for the Dancing Times), daily newspapers and other professional publications.
