= Max Niehaus =

German writer and dance researcher (1888–1981)

Max Niehaus (17 December 1888 – 8 April 1981) was a German writer, dance researcher and ballet publicist.

== Life ==
Born in Wesel, Niehaus, who was a full-time civil servant in Wiesbaden, was considered one of the leading representatives of factual modern dance literature. He was also a staff member at the Goethe-Institut, where he was responsible for German ballet guest performances abroad. His international contacts gave him a comprehensive view of the dance scene and also shaped his publications. These dealt both with German dancers such as Heinz Bosl and with international dance makers such as Isadora Duncan and Vaslav Nijinsky. His friendship with Sergei Diaghilev and the Ballets Russes as well as with numerous German and American artists allowed him to conduct intensive research. He gained professional international recognition by setting up ballet photo exhibitions in New York City, Brussels, Naples and Munich. The special feature of the photos was that they did not depict posed positions, but rather snapshots of the performance process. Niehaus also published an annual ballet calendar from 1958.

Niehaus died in Munich at the age of 92. His estate is housed in the Deutsches Tanzarchiv Köln.

== Work ==
=== Monographs ===
- Sardinien: ein Reisebuch. Societäts-Verlag, Frankfurt, 1938
- Ballett. Prestel Verlag, München 1954.
- Junges Ballett. Nymphenburger Verlag, München 1957 – NA 1972.
- Himmel, Hölle und Trikot – Heinrich Heine und das Ballett. Nymphenburger Verlag, München 1959.
- Nijinsky. Gast aus einer anderen Welt. Prestel Verlag, München 1961.
- Ballett im Bild. Nymphenburger Verlag, München 1961.
- Ballett-Faszination. Heyne, München 1972, ISBN 3-453-01061-2 – NA 1978 mit einem Kommentar vom Tanzarchiv Köln.
- Heinz Bosl. Südwest-Verlag, München 1975, NA 1988, ISBN 3-517-00576-2
- Peter Breuer. Nymphenburger Verlag, München 1978.
- Isadora Duncan. Triumph und Tragik einer legendären Tänzerin. Heyne, München 1982. ISBN 3-453-03031-1
