= Yvonne Georgi =

German ballet dancer

- Born: 29 October 1903; Leipzig, German Empire
- Died: 25 January 1975 (aged 71); Hannover, West Germany
- Known for: Ballet dancer and choreographer

Yvonne Georgi (29 October 1903 – 25 January 1975) was a German dancer, choreographer and ballet mistress. She was known for her comedic talents and her extraordinary jumping ability. In her roles as a dancer, choreographer, and ballet mistress, she was an influential figure in dance for decades.

== Biography ==
Georgi was born in Leipzig, Germany on 29 October 1903 to a French-Algerian mother and German father. She did not have any formal training in dance until she was seventeen and was "discovered" during a performance at a friend's home. Though she had initially planned to study librarianship, she soon realized She went on to study at the Dalcroze Institute in Hellerau in 1920 and then the Wigman School in Dresden in 1921. Along with Gret Palucca and Hanya Holm, she was one of the best-known students of Mary Wigman and Robert Gergi.

Georgi debuted in Leipzig in 1923, touring as a soloist across Europe and North America. In 1924, she joined Münster, one of Kurt Jooss's companies.

In 1925, Georgi began her career as a ballet mistress in Gera. While there, she choreographed her first ballets, including Saudades do Brazil to music by Darius Milhaud. These works quickly brought her notability.

From 1926 to 1931, Georgi was the ballet master for Staatsoper Hannover, and was one of the only choreographers to try to combine balletic and modern movement. Her first ballet evening Petrouchka and Pulcinella (1926), was highly successful, and the beginning of a long relationship with guest performer Harald Kreutzberg. Georgi and Kreutzberg performed as a duo across Germany and other countries, including a performance in New York in 1928. Their partnership ended with Le Train Bleu at the Berlin State Opera in 1931.

In 1931, Georgi founded what became the Ballets Yvonne Georgi in Amsterdam. In 1932, Georgi married Lodewijk Arntzenius, a Nazi sympathizer in Holland. From 1933 to 1935, Georgi served as the ballet director in Hanover and toured extensively. During this time, she began working with Henk Badings, who she continued to collaborate with throughout her career.

Georgi returned to the Netherlands during World War II. After the Nazis invaded Holland, Georgi ran the occupation government's dance division until the war ended and she was forced to step down.

After the war, Georgi choreographed the film Ballerina in Paris. In 1951, she returned to Germany, where she directed the Abraxas Company and the Düsseldorf Opera Ballet. She then directed ballet in Hanover, and served as the director of the dance department at Hochschule für Musik, Theater und Medien Hannover until 1973.

Georgi had numerous première performances, among them the Electronic Ballet in 1957 to the music of Henk Badings. Her 1962 ballet Metamorphosen is considered one of the best German ballets of its time.

Georgi died in Hannover on January 25, 1975.
