= Nina Corti =

Swiss flamenco dancer (born 1953)

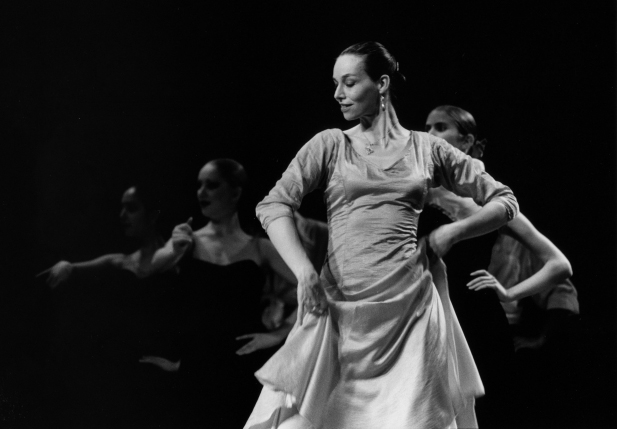
- Corti in 1999.
- Born: 3 August 1953 (age 72); Zürich, Canton of Zürich; Switzerland
- Known for: flamenco

Nina Corti (born 3 August 1953) is a Swiss flamenco dancer and choreographer. In 2007 she was honored by the Swiss government as the first female celebrity to design a stamp for the Swiss Post.

== Early life and family ==
Nina Corti was born on 3 August 1953. Her father, a musician and soloist with the Tonhalle Orchester Zürich, was of Italian and Spanish ancestry. Her mother, an artist, was of Russian and Polish ancestry. She has two brothers and was introduced to music as a young child. She trained as a goldsmith before receiving a scholarship from the city of Zürich to study classical Spanish dance and flamenco in Madrid and Seville for four years.

== Career ==
After studying dance in Spain, Corti performed with Pepe Habichuela, Enrique Morente, the Ketamas, Guadiana, Manitas de Plata, the Gipsy Kings, and Pepe Justicia. She has performed at the Semperoper, the Royal Albert Hall, and the Musikverein.

In 2007, Corti designed a stamp for the Swiss Post, becoming the first female celebrity to be awarded the honor. Her stamp featured a flamenco dancer.

In 2012, she became the director of the program Musica y Danza, where she choreographs works in classical Spanish dance and flamenco.
