= Mary Wigman =

German dancer and choreographer (1886–1973)

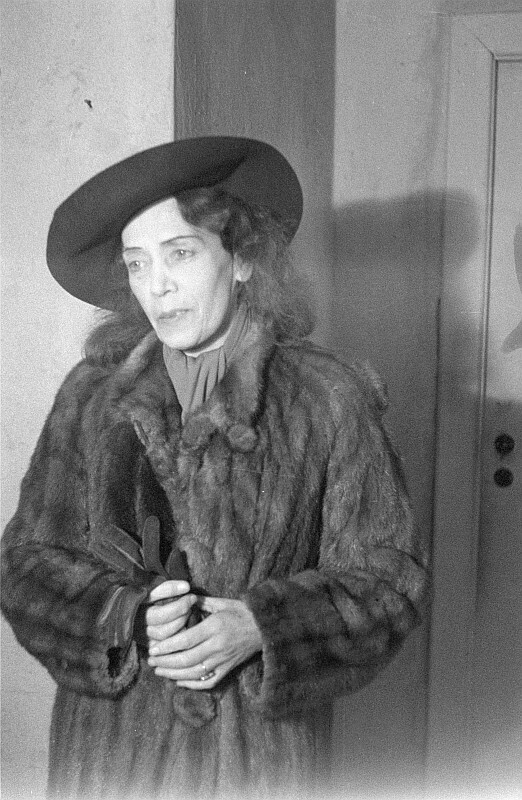
- Wigman in 1946
- Born: Karoline Sophie Marie Wiegmann; 13 November 1886; Hanover, Province of Hanover, Kingdom of Prussia
- Died: 18 September 1973 (aged 86); West Berlin, West Germany
- Known for: modern dance and dance therapy
- Movement: Expressionist dance

Mary Wigman (born Karoline Sophie Marie Wiegmann; 13 November 1886 – 18 September 1973) was a German dancer and choreographer who pioneered expressionist dance, dance therapy, and movement training without pointe shoes. She is considered one of the most important figures in the history of modern dance. She became one of the most iconic figures of Weimar German culture and her work was hailed for bringing the deepest of existential experiences to the stage.

== Early life ==
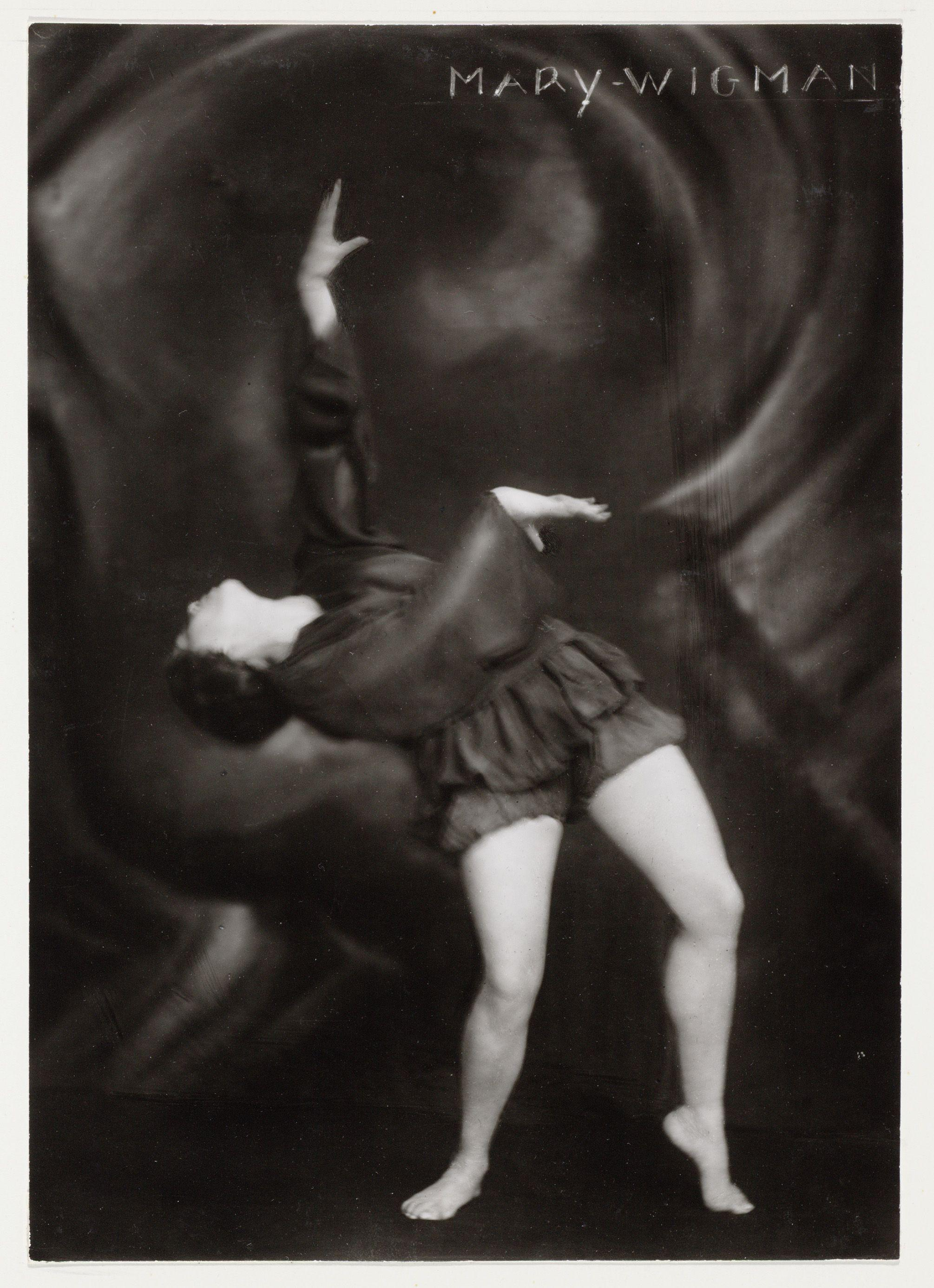
Photograph of German dancer Mary Wigman by Dutch photographer Jacob Merkelbach, 1922

Karoline Sophie Marie Wiegmann was born in Hanover, Province of Hanover in the Kingdom of Prussia. Wiegmann was the daughter of a bicycle dealer. Already as a child, she was called Mary, "because the Hanoverians were once kings of England and the House of Welf pride never quite got over the decline of the Kingdom of Hanover to a Prussian province.

=== Development of expressionist dance, early career ===
Wigman spent her youth in Hanover, England, the Netherlands and Lausanne. Wigman came to dance comparatively late after seeing three students of Émile Jaques-Dalcroze, who aimed to approach music through movement using three equally important elements: solfège, improvisation and his own system of movements—Dalcroze eurhythmics. Wigman studied rhythmic gymnastics in Hellerau from 1910 to 1911 with Émile Jaques-Dalcroze and Suzanne Perrottet, but felt artistically dissatisfied there: Like Suzanne Perrottet, Mary Wigman was also looking for movements independent of music and independent physical expression. After that, she stayed in Rome and Berlin. Another key early experience was a solo concert by Grete Wiesenthal.

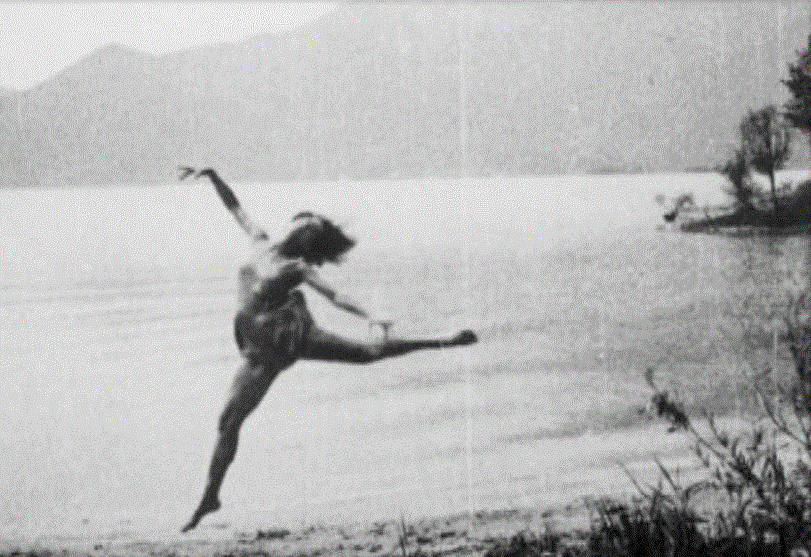
Mary Wigman (Wiegmann) in Monte Verità on Lake Maggiore, enrolled at the Rudolf von Laban School for Art, between 1913 and 1918

The Jaques-Dalcroze school's practice made dance secondary to music, so Wigman decided to take her interests elsewhere. In 1913, on advice from the German-Danish expressionist painter Emil Nolde, she entered the Rudolf von Laban School for Art (Schule für Kunst) on Monte Verità in the Swiss canton of Ticino. Laban was significantly involved in the development of modern expressive dance (Labanotation). She enrolled in one of Laban's summer courses and was instructed in his technique. Following their lead, she worked on a technique based on contrasts of movement; expansion and contraction, pulling and pushing. She continued with the Laban school through the Swiss summer sessions and the Munich winter sessions until 1919.

In Munich, Wigman showed her first public dances Hexentanz I, Lento and Ein Elfentanz. During the First World War she stayed in Switzerland with Laban as his assistant and taught in Zürich and Ascona. In 1917, Wigman offered three different programs in Zürich, including Der Tänzer unserer lieben Frau, Das Opfer, Tempeltanz, Götzendienst and four Hungarian dances according to Johannes Brahms. In 1918, Wigman suffered a nervous breakdown. Wigman performed this program again in Zürich in 1919 and later in Germany. Only the performances in Hamburg and Dresden brought her the big breakthrough.

=== Weimar Republic period ===
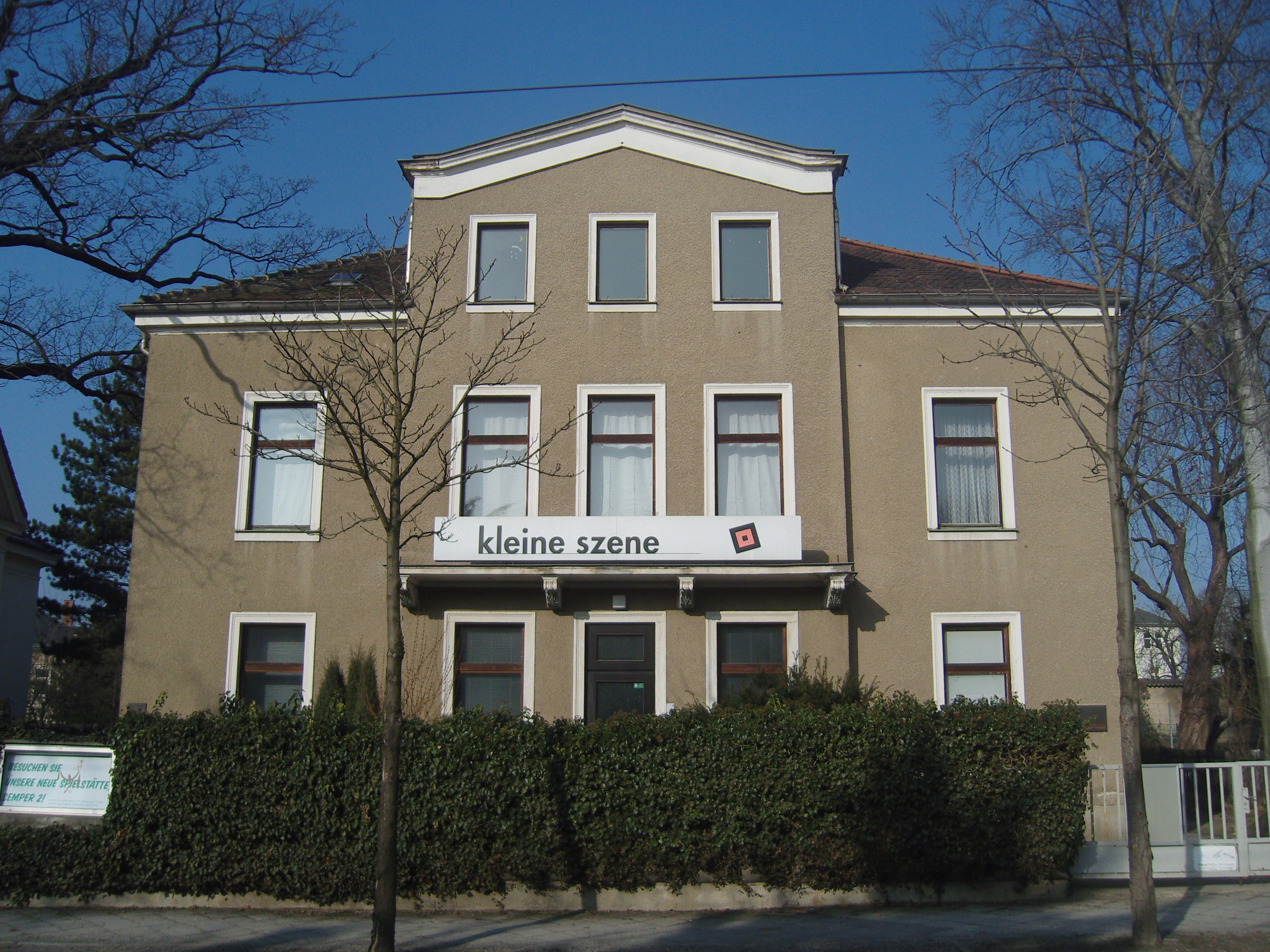
Wigman's dance school building on Bautzner Strasse in Dresden.

In 1920, Wigman was offered the post of ballet mistress at the Saxon State Opera in Dresden, but, after taking up residence in a hotel in Dresden and beginning to teach dance classes while awaiting her anticipated appointment, she learned that the position had been awarded to someone else. In the same year, Wigman together with her assistant Bertha Trümpy, opened a school for modern dance on Bautzner Strasse in Dresden. During Wigman's time in Dresden, Wigman had contacts with the city's lively art scene, for example with the German expressionist painter Ernst Ludwig Kirchner. Rivalry and competition between Wigman's new school and the old schools of dance in Dresden would emerge, later especially with former students and teachers of the Palucca School of Dance. From 1921, the first performances took place with Wigman's dance group. Film recordings of the dance group made in 1923 in the Berlin Botanical Garden with excerpts from Szenen aus einem Tanzdrama were used in the 1925 German cultural silent film Ways to Strength and Beauty (Wege zu Kraft und Schönheit). For a long time, the school on Bautzner Strasse in Dresden was a rehearsal stage for the Saxon State Opera in Dresden. When the school moved under the name Semper Zwei next to the opera house, the state capital of Dresden bought the property and in 2019 gave it to the association Villa Wigman for Dance (Villa Wigman für Tanz e. V.), which uses it as a rehearsal and performance centre for the independent dance scene.

Wigman's most famous male student was Harald Kreutzberg, but there was also Ernest Berk who worked in the UK from 1934 until the mid-1980s. Famous students included Gret Palucca, Hanya Holm, Yvonne Georgi, Margherita Wallmann, Lotte Goslar, Birgit Åkesson, Sonia Revid, and Hanna Berger. Dore Hoyer, who further developed the expressive dance of Wigman and Palucca, worked together with Wigman on several occasions but was never her student. Student Irena Linn taught Wigman's ideas in the United States at Boston Conservatory and in Tennessee. Ursula Cain was also one of Wigman's students.

On tour, Wigman travelled throughout Germany and neighbouring countries with her chamber dance group. In 1928, Wigman performed for the first time in London and in 1930 in the United States. In the 1920s, Wigman was the idol of a movement that wanted dance free of being subordinate to music. Wigman rarely danced to music not composed for her. It was often only danced to the accompaniment of gongs or drums and in rare cases without any music at all, which was particularly popular in intellectual circles.

=== Selected works choreographed and dance school success ===
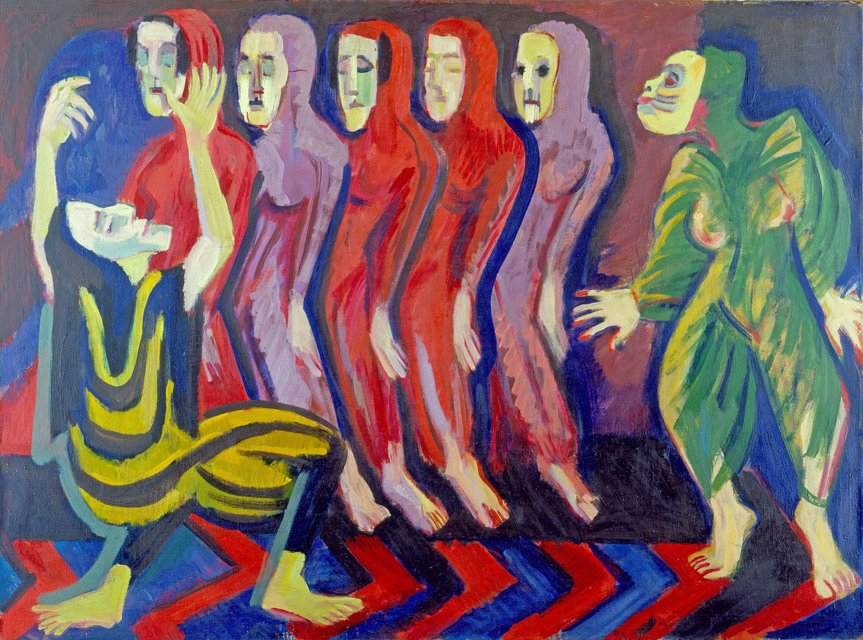
Ernst Ludwig Kirchner: Mary Wigman's Dance of Death, 1926–1928

Wigman ceaselessly created and choreographed new solo dances, including Tänze der Nacht, Der Spuk, Vision (all 1920), Tanzrhythmen I and II, Tänze des Schweigens (all 1920–23), Die abendlichen Tänze (1924), Visionen (1925), Helle Schwingungen (1927), Schwingende Landschaft (1929) and Das Opfer (1931). Group dances were titled Die Feier I (1921), Die sieben Tänze des Lebens (1921), Szenen aus einem Tanzdrama (1923/24), Raumgesänge (1926), Die Feier II (1927/28) and Der Weg (1932).

In 1930, Wigman worked at the Munich Dancers' Congress as a choreographer and dancer in the choir work Das Totenmal created by Albert Talhoff in honour of the dead of World War I. By 1927, Wigman had 360 students in Dresden alone, and more than 1,200 students were taught at branches operated by former students in Berlin, Frankfurt, Chemnitz, Riesa, Hamburg, Leipzig, Erfurt, Magdeburg, Munich, and Freiburg, including from 1931 one in New York City by former student Hanya Holm. The engineer and Siemens manager Hanns Benkert helped Wigman part-time with the administration of this large organization and also became her life partner between 1930 and 1941. Wigman has been photographed dancing and in portraits by many well-known photographers, including Hugo Erfurth, Charlotte Rudolph, Albert Renger-Patzsch and Siegfried Enkelmann. The commemorative stamp of the German Federal Post shown here is based on a photo by Albert Renger-Patzsch. Ernst Ludwig Kirchner created the painting Totentanz der Mary Wigman (Mary Wigman's Dance of Death) in the mid-1920s.

=== United States tour ===
Wigman toured the United States in 1930 with her dance company, and again in 1931 and 1933. A Wigman school was founded by her disciples in New York City in 1931 and her work through dance and movement contributed as a gateway for social change with the New Dance Group in the 1930s, this group was started by students from Wigman's New York school. Wigman's work in the United States is credited to her protegee Hanya Holm, and then to Holm's students Alwin Nikolais and Joan Woodbury. Another student and protegee of Wigman, Margret Dietz, taught in America from 1953 to 1972. During this time, Wigman's style was characterized by critics as "tense, introspective, and sombre," yet there was always an element of "radiance found even in her darkest compositions."

== Dance under National Socialism ==
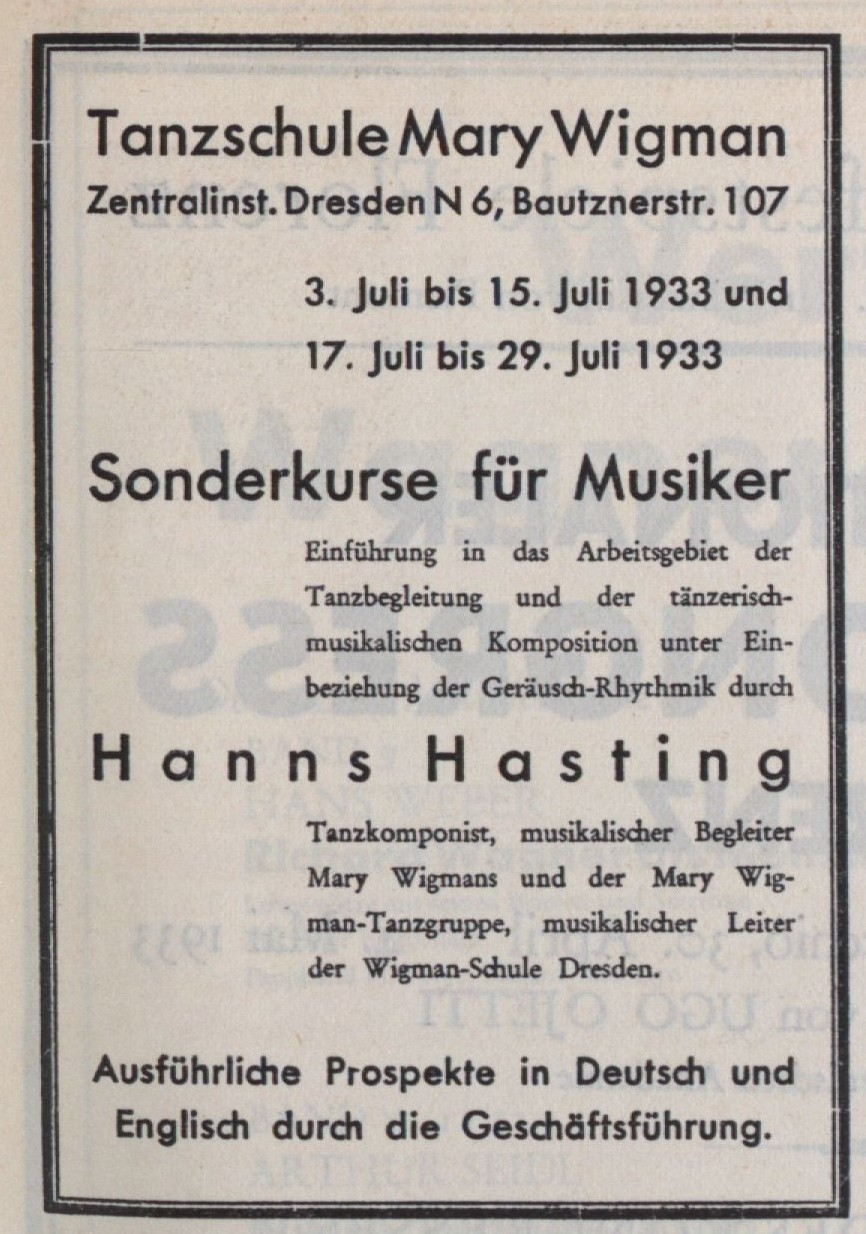
Mary Wigman dance school advertisement from 1933 in the Neue Zeitschrift für Musik

The seizure of power by the National Socialists in 1933 had an immediate effect on Wigman's school through the new law against racial overcrowding in German schools and universities of 25 April 1933 (Gesetz gegen die Überfüllung deutscher Schulen und Hochschulen). Wigman initially obtained an exemption by allowing her "5% pupils of non-Aryan descent" for the course from September 1933. However, in the course of the following years, a number of Wigman's students were forced to emigrate, such as the Jewish Berlin prima ballerina Ruth Abramovitsch Sorel and member of Wigman's dance company Pola Nirenska, whom Wigman had organized to perform at a school audition in 1935 and teacher for a summer course, whereupon Wigman was accused of "friendliness toward Jews" in 1935 and 1937. The Wigman school became a member of the Militant League for German Culture (Kampfbund für deutsche Kultur) in 1933. Wigman took over the local group leadership of the "Department of gymnastics and dance" (Fachschaft Gymnastik und Tanz) in the National Socialist Teachers League in 1933–1934, but noted for example "Local group meeting – sickening!" in her diary. With Schicksalslied (1935) and Herbstliche Tänze (1937) further solo dances were created.

The Nazi press had criticized some of the 1934 dances by Wigman and other choreographers, for being insufficiently or unimpressively German, the 1935 Rogge and Wernicke works were lauded as appropriate examples of "heroic" German bodily movement, but Goebbels apparently disliked Amazonen for being too Greek in its iconography. In 1936 Wigman choreographed the Totenklage with a group of 80 dancers for the Olympic Youth Festival to mark the opening of the 1936 Summer Olympics in Berlin.

In 1942, Wigman sold her school in Dresden. She received a guest teaching contract at the dance department of the University of Music and Theatre Leipzig, where the concert pianist Heinz K. Urban accompanied her as a répétiteur. In the same year, Wigman appeared for the last time as a solo dancer with Abschied und Dank (Farewell and Thanks).

=== German dance festivals and Goebbels Nazi propaganda ===
Amidst the fall of Weimar Germany to Nazism, Wigman's contributions to modern dance existed within the umbrella of Nazism and the rejection of structured dance (ballet) in favour of “freer” movements. Marion Kant writes in “Dance is a Race Question: The Dance politics of the Reich Ministry of Popular Enlightenment and Propaganda” that Wigman's dance style became a means through which Nazi ideologies were propagated. Describing Nazi perceptions of art, records of the Propaganda Ministry in the Federal Archives “embody an ideology to which dance became subject,” as Ausdruckstanz, or the new German Dance, arose as a widely accepted art form due to Nazi leaders’ beliefs that dance would benefit the movement. Document 4 in Kant's work features a letter from Fritz Böhme to Goebbels, which articulates how the “German artistic dance ... must not be allowed to be neglected as an art form” and must “function... as a constructive and formative force, as the guardian of racial values, and as a shield against the flood of confusing foreign postures alien to the German character and German stance”. Wigman and her colleagues’ modern dance styles were therefore deemed a means by which the German people could be shielded by outside influence and purified. A note from Ministerial Councilor von Keudell to the Reich Ministry for Popular Enlightenment and Propaganda also recognized Wigman's school as one of the “four model schools of German art dance”. Ultimately, these records reveal how Wigman's work fit into the narrative of Nazism and how the fall of the Weimar Republic allowed for Wigman's success, yielding to the acceptance of “free” dance as Nazi propaganda.

Wigman's work also contributed to dance as a gateway for fascist community-building. Susan Manning writes in “Modern Dance in the Third Reich, Redux” that “modern dancers conflated and confused their ideal of the Tanzgemeinschaft (‘dance community’) with the fascist ideal of Volksgemeinschaft (‘ethnic community’)”. German dance environments therefore indirectly supported budding Nazi communities. Manning cites another work by Kant, “Death and the Maiden: Mary Wigman in the Weimar Republic,” in which Kant examines many writings by Wigman in the early years of the rise of Nazism in Germany. Here, Wigman seemed to express support for “the conservative and right-wing nationalists... who would bring down the Republic,” which Manning claims was instrumental in “bringing Volkish thought into the mainstream of Weimar politics”. Modern dance therefore became a hallmark of German unification, with Wigman's art heading the establishment of Volkish communities through dance. Whether Wigman's contributions to Nazism and its rise were intentional or unintentional is a matter of dispute, as Manning recognizes that “Mary Wigman could [have]... opposed Nazi cultural policy, without recognizing that her own belief... reinforced the Nazi position”. Yet, despite Wigman's personal attitudes toward the Nazi Party, her work undoubtedly coexisted and even fit within Nazi ideals of Aryan freedom, community, and identity.

== Post-war Germany ==
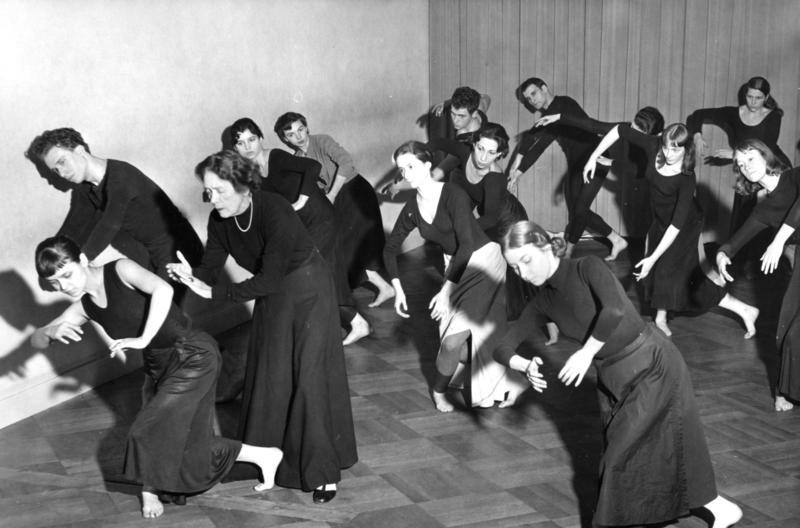
Mary Wigman dance studio, West Berlin 1959

After 1945, Wigman began again with a Leipzig school and in 1947 staged a sensational performance of Orfeo ed Euridice with her pupils at the Leipzig Opera. In 1949, Wigman settled in West Berlin, where she founded a new expressive dance school, the Mary Wigman Studio.

=== Schiller Prize and Order of Merit ===
In 1954, Wigman received the Schiller Prize of the City of Mannheim and in 1957 the Great Cross of the Order of Merit of the Federal Republic of Germany. In 1967, she closed her West Berlin studio and devoted herself to lecturing at home and abroad. Mary Wigman died in 1973. Her funerary urn was buried on 14 November of that year in the Wiegmann family grave at the Ostfriedhof in Essen, Germany.

== Productions ==
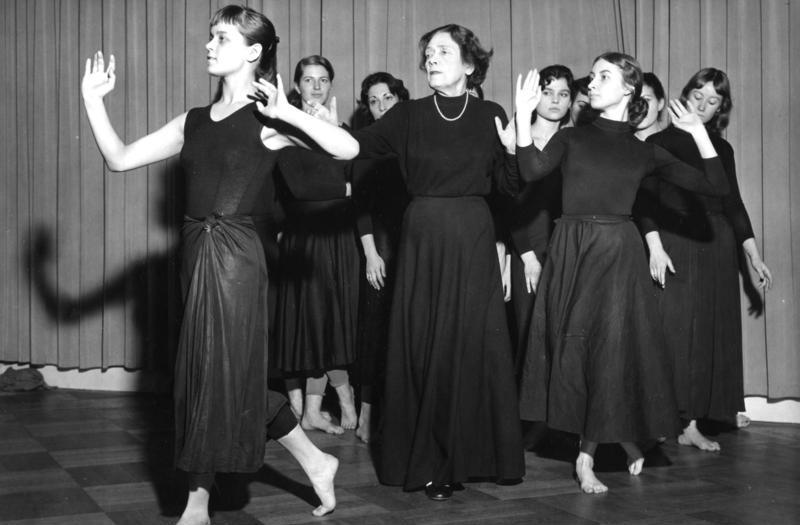
Mary Wigman studio, West Berlin

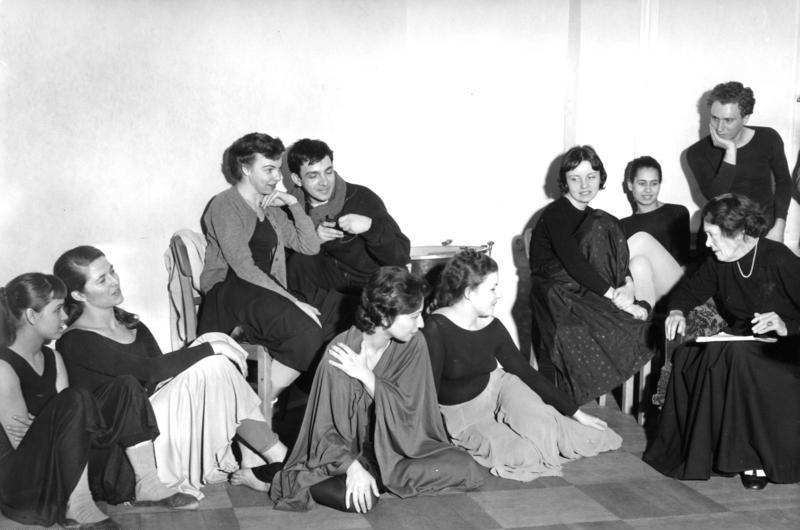
West Berlin 1959

Wigman gave her first public performance in Munich in February 1914, performing two of her own dances, including one called Lento and the first version of Hexentanz (Witch Dance), which later became one of her most important works.

While recovering from her nervous breakdown in 1918, Wigman wrote the choreography for her first group composition, Die sieben Tänze des Lebens (The Seven Dances of Life), which premiered several years later, in 1921. After that her career and influence began in earnest.

In 1925, the Italian financier Riccardo Gualino invited Wigman to Turin to perform in his private theatre and in his newly opened Teatro di Torino. She had several years' success on the concert stage.

Wigman's dances were often accompanied by world music and non-Western instrumentation, such as fifes and primarily percussion, bells, including the gongs and drums from India, Thailand, Africa, and China, contrasted with silence. In later years, she used composers' talents to create music to accompany her choreography, and many choreographers began to use this tactic.

She would often employ masks in her pieces, influenced again by non-western/tribal dance. She did not use typical costumes associated with ballet. The subject matters included in her pieces were heavy, such as the death and desperation that surrounded the war. However, she did not choreograph to represent the happenings of the war; she danced to outwardly convey the feelings that people were experiencing in this hard time.

== Recognition ==
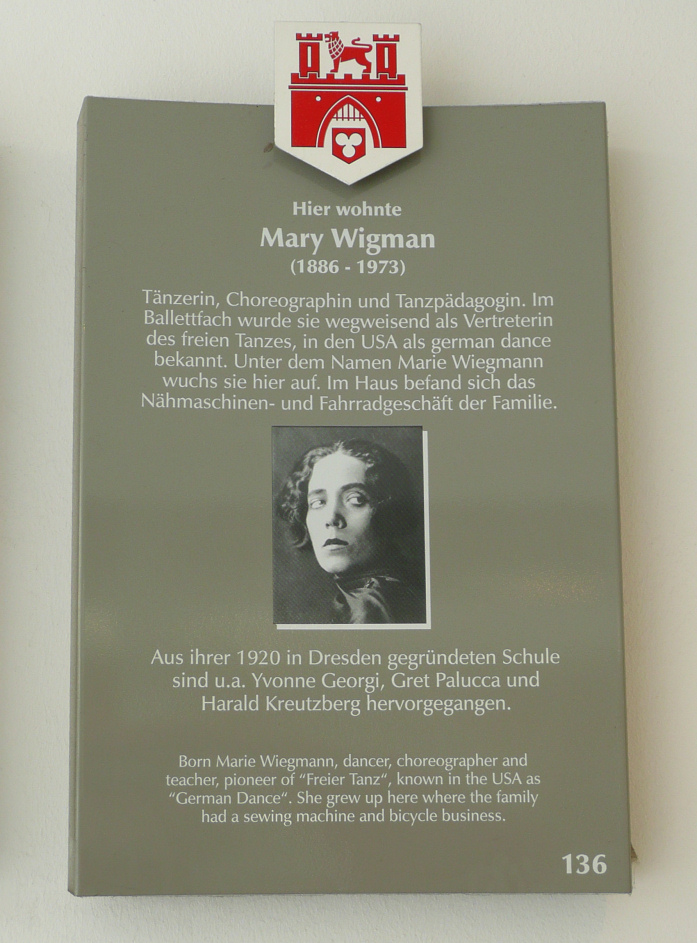
Commemorative plaque attached to Wigman's former home at Schmiedestrasse 18 in Hannover, Germany

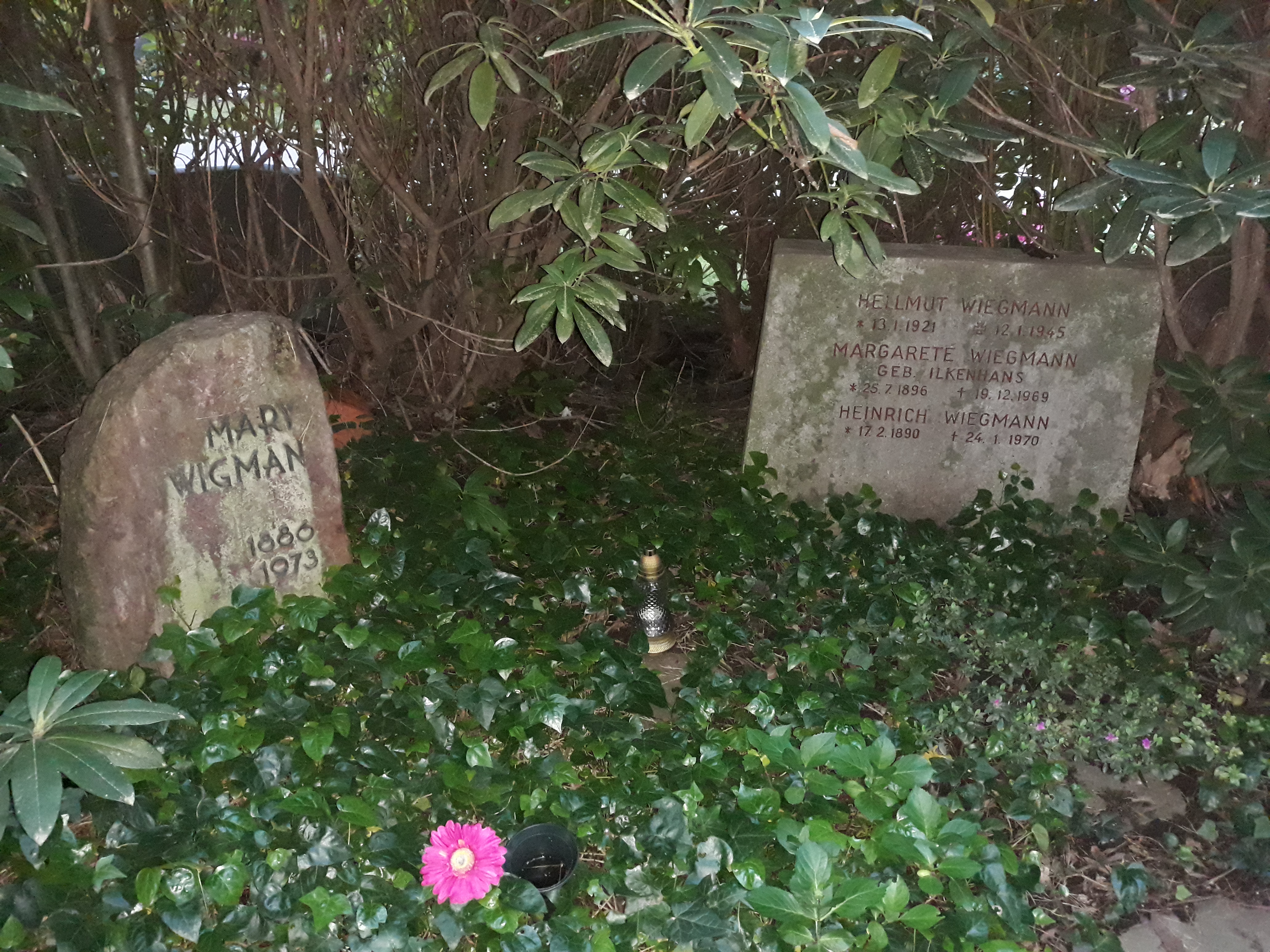
Mary Wigman's grave in the family plot at Ostfriedhof in Essen, Germany

Wigman's former student Katharine Sehnert still teaches dance technique and improvisation based on the Wigman style. In Dresden, a street in the Seevorstadt and near Dresden Hauptbahnhof, which had previously been named after Anton Saefkow, was named after Mary Wigman. Streets were also named after her in the Vilich-Müldorf district of Bonn, in the Bothfeld district of Hanover and in the Käfertal district of Mannheim. In Hanover, a commemorative plaque was attached to Wigman's former home at Schmiedestrasse 18. In Leipzig, a memorial plaque on the house at Mozartstrasse 17 commemorates Wigman, who lived and taught there from 1942 until she moved to West Berlin in 1949.

=== Mary Wigman Societies and Mary Wigman Foundation ===
The first Mary Wigman Society was founded in Berlin in November 1925 as a society of friends of the Mary Wigman Dance Group. Founding members included the theatre director Max von Schillings, Reichskunstwart Edwin Redslob, the composer Eugen d'Albert, the painters Emil Nolde and Conrad Felixmüller, the archaeologist and senior government minister Ludwig Pallat, the journalists and theatre critics Alfred Kerr and Artur Michel, the art historian Fritz Wichert, Wilhelm Worringer and Wilhelm Pinder and Privy Councilor Erich Lexer, a surgeon. It only existed for a few years.

The Mary Wigman Gesellschaft e. V., which has been committed to the history and future of modern dance for decades, published the Tanzdrama (Dance Drama) magazine and organized a number of symposia, which was converted into a Mary Wigman Foundation (Mary Wigman Stiftung) in 2013. This is located at the German Dance Archive Cologne (Deutsches Tanzarchiv Köln), which also owns the rights of use for Mary Wigman's works.

=== Mary Wigman Prize ===
Since 1993, the Foundation for the Promotion of the Semperoper has honoured outstanding artists or ensembles who belong or belonged to the Saxon State Opera (Sächsischen Staatsoper) with the Mary Wigman Prize. The award is presented annually at a gala – the foundation's prizewinners' concert. The first prize winner in 1993 was Stephan Thoss. The prize was not awarded from 2006 to 2012.

== Works published ==
- Die sieben Tänze des Lebens. Tanzdichtung. Diederichs, Jena 1921.
- Komposition. Seebote, Überlingen 1925.
- Deutsche Tanzkunst. Reißner, Dresden 1935.
- Die Sprache des Tanzes. Battenberg, Stuttgart 1963; new edition: Battenberg, Munich 1986, ISBN 978-3-87045-219-3.
- The Language of Dance. Wesleyan University Press, Middletown, Connecticut 1966, ISBN 978-0-8195-6037-7.
- The Mary Wigman Book: Her Writings, Olympic Marketing Corp. 1975 ISBN 0-8195-4079-X

== See also ==
- Ways to Strength and Beauty
- Weimar culture
- Weimar Germany
- Expressionist dance
- Dore Hoyer
- Isadora Duncan
- Ruth St Denis
- List of dancers
- Women in dance
