= Birgit Åkesson =

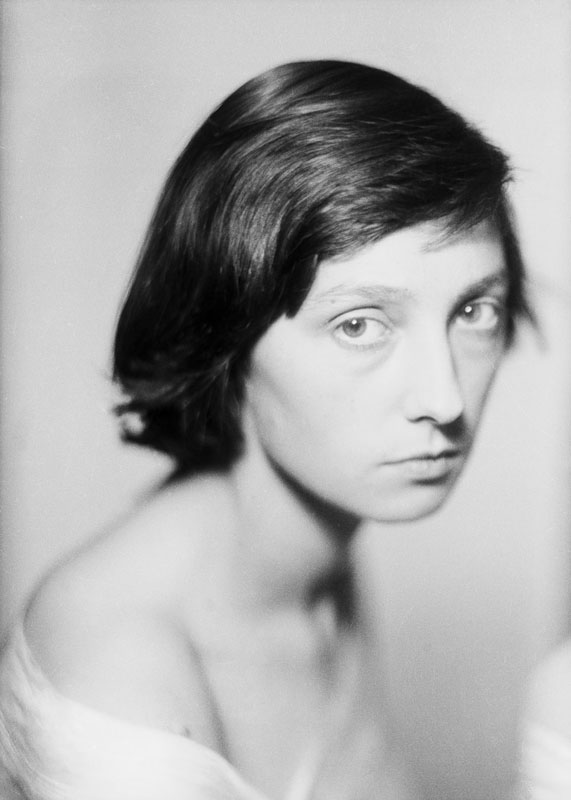
Portrait of Birgit Åkesson at the Royal Swedish Opera, 1950

Anna Ida Birgit Åkesson (24 March 1908 – 24 March 2001) was a Swedish choreographer, dancer and dance researcher.

== Biography ==
Birgit Åkesson was born in Malmö and trained as a dancer at Mary Wigman's school in Dresden from 1929 to 1931. After having danced with her a few years, Åkesson knew she wanted something else from this art, but she could not quite put her finger on it yet. She wanted to explore the body's possibilities and limitations. She then decided to go to Paris and start from zero. According to her, she listened to her body and the memories that were stored in it. In 1934 she made her debut with her very own choreography at the Comédie-Française in Paris, but her real breakthrough came only in 1951, when she performed two solos, one in complete silence. After these performances the press went wild and she soon became one of the leading figures in European avant-garde dance.

In the 1950s, she worked together with text and music printer Erik Lindegren and Karl-Birger Blomdahl, and created various works at the Royal Swedish Opera in Stockholm. She mainly created ballets, but also dance scenes in the opera Aniara, where Åkesson's role in the 1959 set are among the most famous. Aniara was an example of an avant-garde idiom in expressionist dance. She left the Opera in 1967 and subsequently spent much time on research trips. Åkesson wanted to find the real essence of dance and its roots, which brought her to Africa. She said that the dance in Europe had lost contact with their origin, and the best ways to study the origins were in Africa. From there she collected a number of dance masks from different countries. After Åkesson's death, her collection of dance masks was donated to the Museum of Ethnography, Sweden, whom subsequently had a show of them in 2008. Birgit Åkesson was one of Sweden's pioneering choreographers during the 1900s.

In 1998 she was awarded the Swedish Academy's grand prize. She received an honorary doctorate from Stockholm University in 1999. She died in Stockholm.

She and Egon Møller-Nielsen had one daughter, Mona, who was married to Carl Fredrik Reuterswärd.

== Filmography ==
- 1948 – Fruktbarhet
- 1954 – Balettprogram

== Choreography ==
- 1948 – Fruktbarhet

== Awards and honours ==
- 1962 – Carina Ari Medal
- 1980 – Läkerols kulturpris|Läkerols svenska kulturpris
- 1992 – Professors namn
- 1998 – The Swedish Academy's Grand Prize
- 1998 – Honorary Doctor of Philosophy at Stockholm University
- 2000 – Sydsvenska Dagbladets cultural prize
