= Dore Hoyer =

German expressionist dancer and choreographer

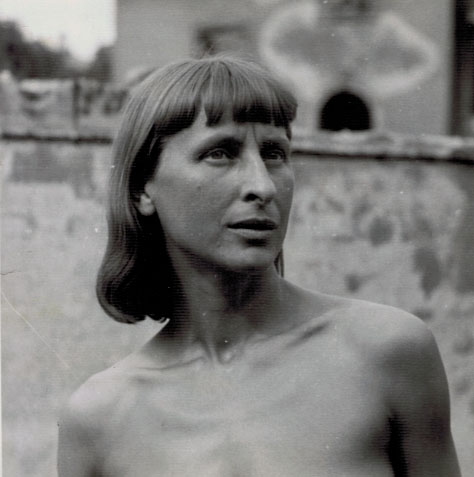
- Born: 12 December 1911; Dresden, German Empire
- Died: 31 December 1967 (aged 56); Berlin, West Germany
- Occupations: Dancer, choreographer

Dore Hoyer (12 December 1911 – 31 December 1967) was a German expressionist dancer and choreographer. She is credited as "one of the most important solo dancers of the Ausdruckstanz tradition." Inspired by Mary Wigman, she developed her own solo programmes and toured widely before and after the Second World War. Wigman called Hoyer "Europe's last great modern dancer."

== Biography ==
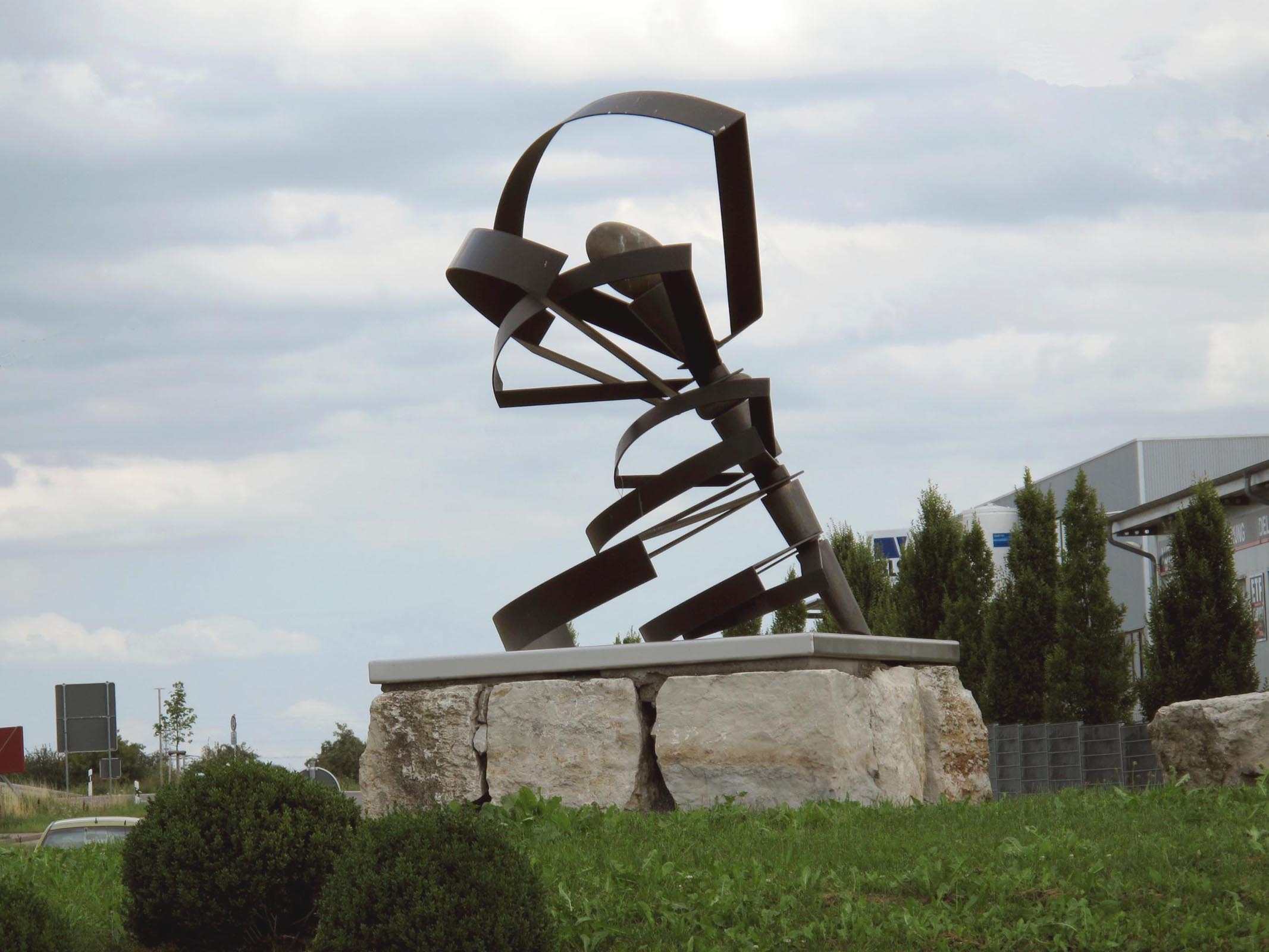
Sculpture in tribute to Dore Hoyer, by Gerlinde Beck

Dore Hoyer was born in Dresden to a working-class family on 12 December 1911. As a young girl, she learned rhythmics and gymnastics. She trained in the style of Hellerau-Laxenburg in 1927–1928, before studying expressionist dance or Ausdruckstanz for a year with Gret Palucca in 1929–1930. In 1931, she was engaged as a soloist in Plauen, and in 1933 she became a ballet mistress in Oldenburg. In 1932 Hoyer met and fell in love with an 18-year-old musician, Peter Cieslak. Cieslak composed a number of solo dance pieces which Hoyer choreographed and performed. He died on 5 April 1935, possibly a suicide.

In 1935–36, with the dance group led by Mary Wigman, Hoyer toured Germany, the Netherlands, Denmark and Sweden. She and other dancers were photographed by artist Edmund Kesting. In 1937 Hoyer was portrayed by the Dresden expressionist painter Hans Grundig on a desolate country road at twilight, utterly alone in the gathering darkness.

In 1940–1941 Hoyer joined Hans Niedecken Gebhard's short-lived Deutsche Tanzbühne in Berlin. During World War II, she performed in various locations including Graz in 1943. After the war, she took over what had been the Mary Wigman-Schule in Dresden as the renamed D.-Hoyer-Studio. This school had been lost by Mary Wigman for political reasons. Under Hoyer's direction, the school created Dances for Käthe Kollwitz. The elderly German artist Käthe Kollwitz was a kindred spirit as she shared Hoyer's dislike for violence and elitism while experiencing empathy with the underprivileged. By 1948 the D.-Hoyer-Studio closed, as German currency reform made it difficult for groups without state funding to survive.

In 1949, Hoyer became director of ballet at the Hamburg State Opera where she was given complete artistic freedom. She left in 1951 after her ambitious plans failed to succeed. She went on to pursue her own career as a soloist and choreographer.

Hoyer spent seasons in Mannheim (1952), Ulm (1954), Athens (1956), Berlin (1957), Salzburg (1963) and Frankfurt (1965). By 1963, she had made five tours to South America and from 1962 she lectured at the Hamburg Academy of Art.

Her choreographic cycle "Affectos Humanos" (1962) was composed by her long-time collaborator, Dimitri Wiatowitsch. It consists of five dances, each focused on one of the 48 types of human affect identified in Spinoza's philosophical writings: "Eitelkeit" (vanity), "Begierde" (lust), "Angst" (fear), "Hass" (hatred), and "Liebe" (love). A highly technical and abstract movement composition, it prefigured post-modern dance styles. It has been studied and reconstructed as recently as 2010.

Hoyer last performed on 18 December 1967 at the Theater des Westens in Berlin. She bore all the costs of the performance, which was poorly attended. In debt and facing the possibility that she would no longer be able to dance because of a knee injury, she committed suicide in Berlin on 31 December 1967. In one of the last letters she wrote before her death, she lamented: "Only in dance could I communicate."

After her death, Hoyer's papers and archives were held by Waltraud Luley, executor of her estate, who has since donated them to the Deutsches Tanzarchiv Köln.

== See also ==
- List of dancers
- Women in dance

== Literature ==
- Bell-Kanner, Karen (1 January 1991). The Life and Times of Ellen Von Frankenberg. Taylor & Francis. pp. 118–. ISBN 978-3-7186-5110-8.
