= Gret Palucca =

German dancer (1902–1993)

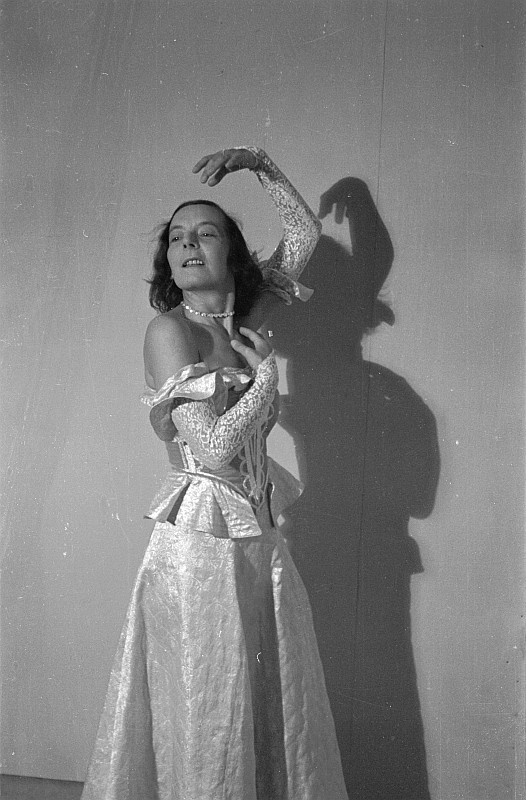
- Palucca in 1945
- Born: Margarethe Paluka; 8 January 1902; Munich, Germany
- Died: 22 March 1993 (aged 91); Dresden, Germany
- Known for: Dance
- Movement: Ballet

Gret Palucca (born Margarethe Paluka; 8 January 1902 – 22 March 1993) was a German dancer and dance teacher, notable for her dance school, the Palucca School of Dance, founded in Dresden in 1925.

== Life and work ==
Margarethe Paluka was born in Munich. Shortly after birth, her family moved to San Francisco, returning with her mother to Dresden in 1909. She had ballet lessons with Heinrich Kröller from 1914 to 1916 and from 1917 to 1918, she attended Margarete Balsat's school for upper-class girls in Dresden.

From 1921, when she changed her name to Gret Palucca, until 1923, she studied with Mary Wigman and she performed as a member of her Chamber Dance Group.

In 1924, she married Friedrich Bienert, who worked in his father's mills. Through her mother-in-law, Ida Bienert, she was introduced to the Bauhaus artists.

In 1925, she opened her own dance school, the Palucca School of Dance, with the support of her husband, after which she and Mary Wigman became competitors. In 1927, she opened a branch of her school in Berlin. In 1931, another branch was opened in Stuttgart.

In 1939, because of her Jewish ancestry the National Socialist authorities closed her schools and she was not allowed to teach dance lessons, however she was permitted to continue dancing herself and in 1936 she even appeared in the Olympic Games in Berlin.

In 1945, during the air raid on Dresden, Palucca lost all her possessions. After 1945, the Russian style of ballet dominated the training in Palucca school.

She became founding member of the East German Academy of Arts. In 1959, East German culture policy officials wanted to see the school transformed into a Soviet-style socialist professional school of dance. To gain support for her demands, Palucca briefly went to West Germany.

In 1993, Palucca died in Dresden, aged 91.

Palucca's work was included in the 2021 exhibition Women in Abstraction at the Centre Pompidou.

== Awards ==
- Founding member of the German Academy of Arts, Berlin (1950, Vizepresident 1965–70)
- Member of the Deutsche Akademie der Darstellenden Künste Hamburg (1965)
- National Prize of the German Democratic Republic (II. class 1960 and 1976, I. class 1981)
- Vaterländischer Verdienstorden of the GDR in Gold (1972)
- Martin-Andersen-Nexö-Kunstpreis of the city of Dresden (1972)
- Honorary Citizen of Dresden (1979)
- Stern (1980) and Großer Stern der Völkerfreundschaft of the GDR (1987)
- Deutscher Tanzpreis (1983)
- Grand Cross of the Order of Merit of the Federal Republic of Germany (1992)

== Legacy ==
Her students included Ruth Berghaus, Lotte Goslar and Dore Hoyer.

== See also ==
- Women in dance
