= Whitgift =

Whitgift may refer to:

- Whitgift, East Riding of Yorkshire, a small village near the confluence of the River Ouse and the River Trent, England
- John Whitgift, an English archbishop, who founded or gave his name to:
  - the Whitgift Foundation
  - the Whitgift Almshouses
  - Whitgift School, an independent school in Croydon
  - Trinity School of John Whitgift, an independent school in Croydon
  - Old Palace School of John Whitgift, an independent school in Croydon
  - Whitgift Centre, a shopping centre in Croydon
  - Whitgift School, Grimsby, a comprehensive school in Grimsby
