= Katja Wulff =

German-Swiss dancer (1890–1992)

- Born: 31 August 1890; Hamburg, German Empire
- Died: 11 June 1992 (aged 101); Basel, Switzerland
- Occupations: Expressionist dancer; Dance instructor
- Spouse: Charles Ferdinand Vaucher (1939–1947; divorced)

Katja Wulff, also Käthe Wulff, (31 August 1890 − 11 June 1992), was a German-Swiss expressionist dancer (Ausdruckstänzerin) and dance instructor. She attended Rudolf von Laban's dance classes and became associated with the Dada movement. She ran a dance school and was still teaching there at the age of 90.

== Life and career ==
Born in Hamburg, Wulff was educated as a teacher of drawing and gymnastics (turnen) from 1912 to 1915. From 1913/14, she took dance lessons with Gertrud Falke, and also attended a 1914 summer class on Monte Verità with Rudolf von Laban, dance theoreticist and pioneer of modern dance. She moved to Zürich in 1916 and studied for three years with Laban and Mary Wigman. She graduated in 1918 with a Diploma of Pedagogy in tänzerisches Turnen und Kunsttanz ("acrobatic dance and expressionist dance"). She founded, together with Suzanne Perrottet, a school for eurythmy. She worked for three years on the Amalfi coast and Capri.

In 1923, Wulff founded a school of Ausdruckstanz in Basel where she still taught at the age of 90. She directed a dance company, Tanzstudio Wulff, from 1926, with Mariette von Meyenburg as choreographer. They collaborated with Paul Sacher, Max Bill, Max Sulzbachner and Méret Oppenheim. She had contact with Dada artists such as Jean Arp and Sophie Taeuber-Arp. She performed at the Tänzerkongresse in Germany from 1928 to 1930 and at the 1939 Landesausstellung (Landi, Swiss state exhibition) in Zürich.

In 1936, Wulff became a Swiss citizen. She married Charles Ferdinand Vaucher, a dancer, actor and stage director from Basel, in 1937. They were divorced in 1947. Wulff died at age 101 in the Felix Platter Spital in Basel.

The dancer Mary Delpy noted that she walked like a queen, had perfect posture, and continued to teach beyond the age of 90 ("Katja war immer sehr dezent gekleidet und hatte, ich möchte sagen, einen fast königlichen Gang – gerader Rücken, perfekte Haltung. Sie war eine grosse, schöne Frau. Bis mit über 90 hat sie Stunden gegeben, Schülerinnen ausgebildet und sass daneben, wenn ehemalige Schülerinnen Stunden gaben, hat sich eingemischt und mal etwas gesagt dazu. Sie war eine ganz tolle Frau.") Her nachlass is held by the Deutsches Tanzarchiv Köln.

== See also ==
- List of dancers

== Literature ==
- Vera Isler: Schaut uns an: Porträts von Menschen über Achtzig. Birkhäuser, Basel 1986, ISBN 3-0348-6530-9 (, p. 92, at Google Books).
- Frank-Manuel Peter: "Falls Sie geneigt sind zu kommen..." Käthe (Katja) Wulff zum 100. Geburtstag. In: Tanzdrama magazine. No. 12, 3rd quarter 1990, pp. 18–22.
- Bettina Zeugin: Katja Wulff. Published by IG Tanz Basel. Zwischen-Raum-Verlag, Basel 2001.
