= Movement pattern analysis =

Movement pattern analysis (MPA) is a system used for assessing an individual's motivations in decision-making processes, based on the analysis of nonverbal behaviour. MPA applications include management consulting and career guidance, and proponents estimate that over 30,000 individuals – primarily those involved in senior management – have made use of MPA profiles over the last 50 years.

== Motivational analysis ==
MPA maps out how people are intrinsically motivated to take action and interact with others throughout all stages of a decision-making process. "Intrinsic motivation" refers to inner drive, as opposed to extrinsic motivation – responding positively or negatively to external factors (e.g., wages, punishment). "Decision-making process" is used here to refer to the whole chain of actions involved in thinking through, making choices and implementing decisions. MPA is used by companies and individuals to ensure compatibility between people and areas of responsibility and to improve team-balance.

== Management consulting ==
Professional MPA practitioner training has allowed MPA to spread to a wide range of fields, although its main application has been in management consulting, spanning over 30 countries. Some companies and multinational corporations have continued to use MPA consistently for over three decades, which is rare in the often trend-seeking private sector.

Typical applications of MPA in management consulting include: personal-, leadership-, and team-development; MPA coaching and self-management; recruiting and (re-)definition of roles; planning-structures for meetings and long-term strategies.

== History ==
MPA was developed by Warren Lamb in the 1940s and '50's, building upon the innovations of movement theorist Rudolf Laban and one of the UK's first management consultants, F. C. Lawrence. Warren Lamb assisted Laban and Lawrence in their research within British industry – first among factory workers – then focusing on management.

Laban and Lawrence realised early on that certain aspects and qualities of thinking are echoed in other kinds of bodily movement – and vice versa. Warren Lamb went on to synthesise these and his own findings and develop a method – now known as MPA – for analysing core initiatives in decision-making.

While developing the grounded theory that underpins MPA, Warren Lamb discovered distinctions to be made between gestures, postural movements and what he dubbed “posture-gesture mergers” or “PGMʼs” (waves of consistently integrated movement, involving the whole body). While isolated gestures and certain postures might have some social or cultural significance in a specific context, PGMʼs have the potential to transcend cultural and social specificity, revealing a person's underlying motivations in decision-making. Lamb also identified, among other things, the correlation between styles of interaction (in behaviour) and the relationship between "effort" and "shape" (in movement).
