= Rudolf von Laban =

Austrian choreographer

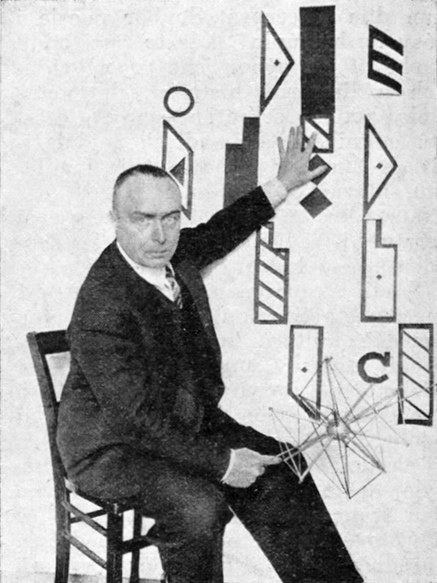
- Laban presenting his system of Labanotation, c. 1929
- Born: Rudolf Laban; 15 December 1879; Pressburg, Kingdom of Hungary, Austria-Hungary (modern-day Bratislava, Slovakia)
- Died: 1 July 1958 (aged 78); Weybridge, England
- Known for: Choreography, dance theory
- Notable work: Labanotation (a movement notation system)
- Movement: Expressionist dance
- Partner: Lisa Ullman

Rudolf (von) Laban, also known as Rudolph von Laban (Hungarian: Lábán Rudolf; 15 December 1879 – 1 July 1958), was an Austro-Hungarian dance artist, choreographer, and movement theorist. He is considered a "founding father of expressionist dance" and a pioneer of modern dance. His theoretical innovations included Laban movement analysis (a way of documenting human movement) and Labanotation (a movement notation system), which paved the way for further developments in dance notation and movement analysis. He initiated one of the main approaches to dance therapy. His work on theatrical movement has also been influential. He attempted to apply his ideas to several other fields, including architecture, education, industry, and management.

Following a dress rehearsal of Laban's last choral work, Of the Warm Wind and New Joy, which he had prepared for the 1936 Summer Olympics in Berlin, Joseph Goebbels cancelled the piece after which time Laban fell out of favor with the National Socialist government. He eventually left Germany for England in 1937 after four years of working with the Nazi regime. Between 1945 and 1946, he and his long-term collaborator and former student Lisa Ullmann founded the Laban Art of Movement Guild in London, and the Art of Movement Studio in Manchester, where he worked until his death. The Trinity Laban Conservatoire of Music and Dance in London has continued this legacy.

== Life and work ==
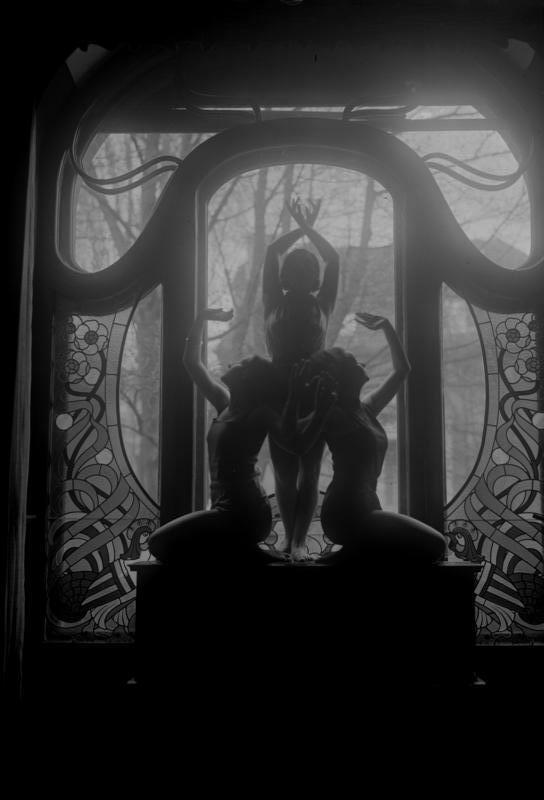
A group of figures in front of a window, formed by dance students at Laban's Choreographic Institute in Berlin-Grunewald (November 1929).

Laban was the son of Rudolf Laban Sr. (1843–1907), a military governor in Pressburg (Pozsony) and (from 1899) field marshal in the Austro-Hungarian Army in the provinces of Bosnia-Herzegovina, and Marie (née Bridling; 1858–1926). In 1897, Laban senior was ennobled by the Hungarian monarchy in recognition of his military merit and received the nobiliary predicate "de" to his family name (choosing Laban de Váralja; a place name associated with the Laban family), whereupon Laban junior was rightly entitled to use "von" in his family name in the German-speaking world. Laban grew up in the courtly circles of Vienna and Sarajevo.

At a young age, Laban joined a csárdás dance group. At age 15 Laban entered the Theresian Military Academy, but later turned his back on military service. In 1899, Laban moved to Munich and began studying at the Academy of Fine Arts (Akademie der bildenden Künste). There Laban met the painter Martha Fricke from Hanover, whom he married on 15 December 1900. They moved to Arcisstr 44, where their daughter Azraela was born in 1901.

Parallel to Laban's studies at the art academy, he took courses at the newly opened teaching and experimental studio for free and applied art (Lehr- und Versuchsatelier für Freie und Angewandte Kunst). There Laban met his future friend Hermann Obrist, who ran the nature studies course. In 1904 Laban decided to leave Munich to visit the most famous art school in Europe, the École des Beaux-Arts in Paris to study architecture.

Laban's son, Arpad, was born in Paris in 1905. After three years of a fulfilled bohemian lifestyle with his wife, Martha Fricke died suddenly. Barely two months after the death of Laban's wife, his father also died, who had made it possible for Laban to lead an independent life with substantial financial support. From then onwards, Laban's two children grew up with their maternal grandparents.

In the years that followed, Laban led an unsteady life between Paris and Vienna, Sanremo and Nice. Financially bankrupt, Laban completed an apprenticeship as an accountant in Nice, from which he also successfully graduated. That was to be Laban's only encounter with a regular working life.

Living with his mother in Vienna, Laban made a living as a graphic artist and caricaturist. Laban drew for the magazines Simplicissimus and Jugend and continued the studies he had begun in Paris on historical dance forms. At a cultural event, Laban met the singer Maja Lederer from Munich and married her on 8 May 1910 in Pressburg. In the same year, they moved to Munich. With his second wife, Laban moved into a dwelling in Schwabing at Hohenzollernstraße 120.

In 1911, Laban rented a room in a rear building in Munich's Theresienstraße, which he set up as a makeshift movement studio. Laban couldn't make a living with his school; he had to continue working as a commercial artist and caricaturist. Overworked to the point of exhaustion, Laban collapsed in 1912 and went to the Lahmann-Sanatorium Weißer Hirsch near Dresden for a cure, where patients were cared for according to the life-reform (Lebensreform) principles. In this natural healing institution, Laban met and fell in love with Suzanne Perrottet, who was also a patient there. In the years that followed, a largely harmonious triangular relationship developed between Perrottet, Laban and his wife.

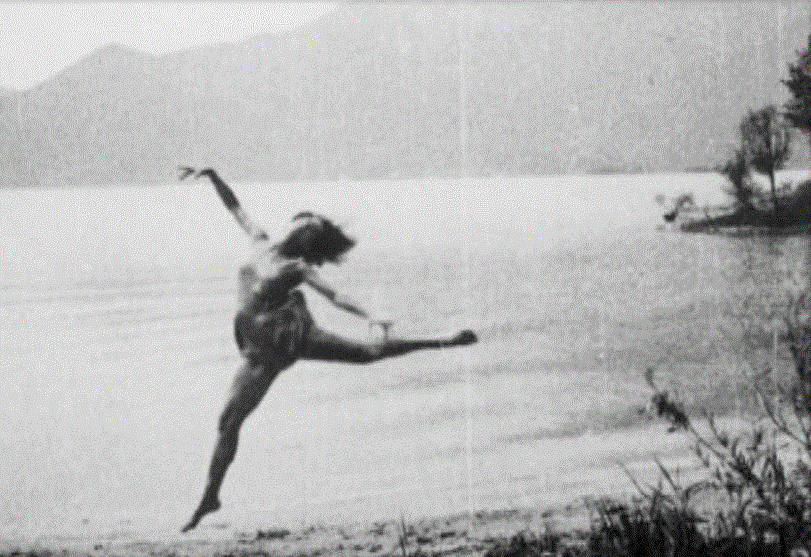
Mary Wigman (Wiegmann) in Monte Verità on Lake Maggiore, enrolled at the Rudolf von Laban School for Art, between 1913 and 1918

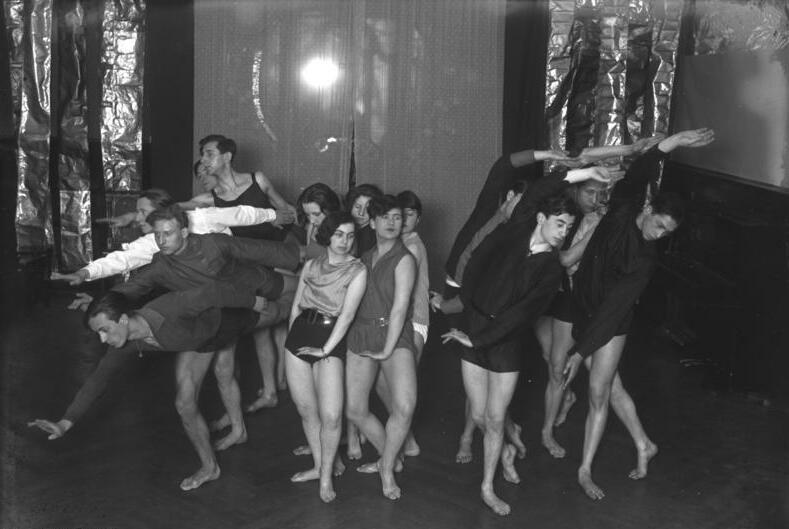
Young people performing a rhythmic dance at Laban's Choreographic Institute in Berlin-Grunewald (1929).

Perrottet was to become Laban's most important collaborator (along with Mary Wigman and Katja Wulff), lover and mother of his child Allar Perrottet (later André Perrottet von Laban) in Ascona and Zürich. During the First World War, Laban created a school on the natural healing colony Monte Verità in the Swiss canton of Ticino, in the municipality of Ascona, which soon attracted many followers of the new dance art. It was here that Laban conducted his famous summer dance courses from 1913 to 1919. Here the students also strived to live in harmony with nature by growing their own food, vegetarianism, weaving cloth and making their own reform-style clothing, and dancing in the great outdoors nature often nude experimenting with dynamic improvisations. Here Laban experienced his intellectual and artistic breakthrough, celebrating the "neuen Menschen", "Fiur-Menschen", "Anarchos", and "Orgiastos" in expressionist dance dramas.

In 1915 Laban, his wife and their two children and Perrottet and son Allar moved to Hombrechtikon near Zürich. There, the extended family lived a self-sufficient lifestyle similar to that on Monte Verità, growing their own food, doing a lot of manual work and sewing their own clothes (e.g. Perrottet developed comfortable clothing for everyday work and dance, which can be attributed to the dress reform movement). At the same time, Laban founded a school for the art of movement (Schule für Bewegungskunst) in Zürich. It included interdisciplinary dance art, pantomime, improvisation and experiments with the body, voice, instruments, texts and even drawing. Later Laban only mentioned the terms: form, sound, word.

The conclusion of a large vegetarian and pacifist congress at the end of summer 1917 on Monte Verità in Ascona was the three-part dance drama Sang an die Sonne to a text by Otto Borngräber. It began with the setting of the sun, which was followed by the dance of the demons of the night. This part was staged at midnight high in the mountains in front of poet-prophet Gustav Gräser's rock grotto. The face masks were created by the Dadaist Marcel Janco. Early in the morning the rising, "victorious" sun was greeted as an expression of the hope of overcoming the war and a utopian higher development of mankind. At these performances worked also Mary Wigman, Sophie Taeuber and Suzanne Perrottet.

=== Freemasonry ===
Laban had been a member of a Freemason association since 1913, and had founded his own masonic lodge "Johannis lodge of ancient Freemasons of the Scottish-and-Memphis-and-Misraim-Rites in the valley of Zürich" which had six brothers and ten sisters. Whilst on Monte Verità, Laban met the occultist Theodor Reuss, who had been on Monte Verità for some time and had established a local Freemason lodge. On 24 October 1917, Reuss issued a charter to Laban and Hans Rudolf Hilfiker-Dunn (1882–1955) to operate a III° Ordo Templi Orientis Lodge in Zürich called Libertas et Fraternitas.

=== Weimar Germany ===
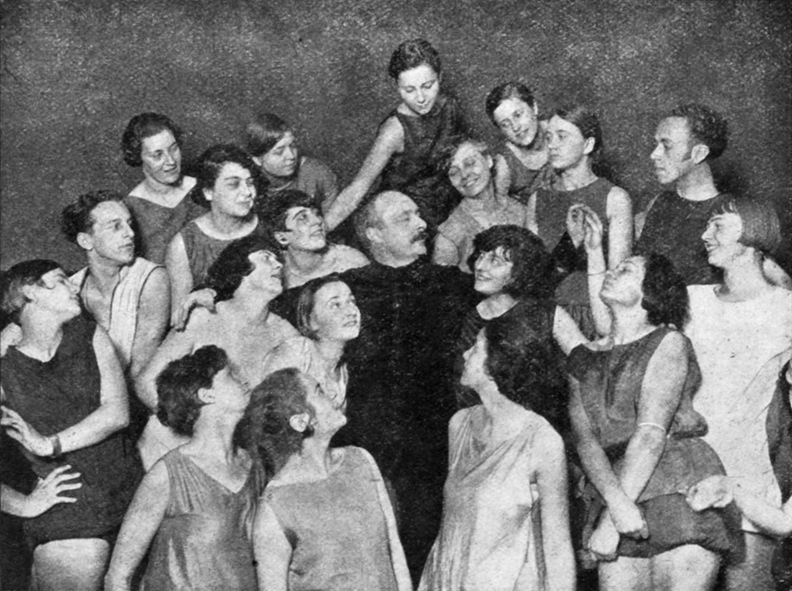
Rudolf von Laban in the midst of his students (ca. 1929).

After the end of World War I, Laban returned to Germany. The Zürich Laban School was taken over and continued by Perrottet. After an interlude in Stuttgart, where Laban worked with the painter Max Ackermann, Laban founded the Tanzbühne Laban (Dance Stage Laban) in Hamburg, Weimar Germany in 1922.

The first public performance of a dance poem by Laban took place in Lübeck in the autumn of 1922 in the State Theatre. They called the performance poster by Karl Gatermann the Elder Der schwingende Tempel (The Swinging Temple), archived under the number PLK-Laban 29 in the Dance Archive Leipzig. In 1923, the first Laban school was founded, which had its own movement choir. The numerous graduates of the Hamburg School successfully carried Laban's method on to various cities in Germany and Europe. In the years that followed, 24 Laban schools were set up across Europe.

In addition, Laban built up a "Choreographic Institute" in Würzburg (1926/27) and Berlin (1928/29). Together with Dussia Bereska, Laban also directed the Chamber Dance Stage (Kammertanzbühne) (1925–1927). Bereska from the Laban School in Hamburg features in the popular 1925 German cultural silent film Wege zu Kraft und Schönheit (Ways to Strength and Beauty) performing Die Orchidee (The Orchid); also featuring in the same film is Mary Wigman and her dance group and the end scene from Laban's dance drama Das lebende Idol (The living Idol) where Laban himself makes an appearance.

From 1930 to 1934, Laban took over the direction of the ballet of the Berlin State Opera. Laban integrated the ideas of psychologist Carl Jung, and in Laban's warm up program the practices of Joseph Pilates, whom according to Pilates, Laban had observed whilst Pilates was working with patients in Hamburg.

=== Laban under National Socialism ===
Laban directed major festivals of dance under the funding of Joseph Goebbels's propaganda ministry from 1934 to 1936. Laban even wrote during this time that "we want to dedicate our means of expression and the articulation of our power to the service of the great tasks of our Volk (People). With unswerving clarity our Führer points the way". In 1936 Laban become the chairman of the association "German workshops for dance" and received a salary of 1250 ℛℳ per month, but a duodenal ulcer in August of that year bed bound him for two months, eventually leading him to ask to reduce his responsibilities to consultancy. This was accepted and his wage reduced to 500 ℛℳ, Laban's employment then ran until March 1937 when his contract ended.

Several allegations of Laban's attachment to Nazi ideology have been made, for instance, as early as July 1933 Laban was removing all pupils branded as non-Aryan from the children's course he was running as a ballet director even though this was not required by law until 1938. However, some Laban scholars have pointed out that such actions were necessary for survival in Nazi Germany at that time, and that his position was precarious as he was neither a German citizen nor a Nazi party member. In fact, the seizure of power by the National Socialists in 1933 had an immediate effect on Laban's work through the new law passed against racial overcrowding in German schools and universities of 25 April 1933 (Gesetz gegen die Überfüllung deutscher Schulen und Hochschulen), Laban was thus bound by this new law of vetting students with the racial characteristic of a "non-Aryan" descent. His work under the Nazi regime culminated in 1936 with Goebbels's banning of Vom Tauwind und der Neuen Freude (Of the Spring Wind and the New Joy), a choreography intended for the 1936 Summer Olympics in Berlin, for not furthering the Nazi agenda.

=== England ===
In very poor health, Laban managed to travel to Paris in August 1937. Eventually, he was invited to England, where in February 1938 he joined up with two of his former students Kurt Jooss and Sigurd Leeder at the Jooss-Leeder Dance School they had founded at Dartington Hall in Devon (thanks to the philanthropy of Leonard Elmhirst and his wife Dorothy Whitney), where innovative dance was already being taught by other refugees from Nazi Germany.

Laban was greatly assisted in his dance teaching during these years by his close associates and long-term partners Lisa Ullmann and Sylvia Bodmer. Their collaboration led to the founding of the Laban Art of Movement Guild (now known as Trinity Laban Conservatoire of Music and Dance) in 1945 and The Art of Movement Studio in Manchester in 1946.

In 1947, together with management consultant Fredrick Lawrence, Laban published a book Effort, Fordistic study of the time taken to perform tasks in the industrial workplace and the energy used. Laban tried to provide methods intended to help eliminate "shadow movements" (which he believed wasted energy and time) and to focus instead on constructive movements necessary to the job at hand. Laban published Modern Educational Dance in 1948 when his ideas on dance for all including children were taught in many British schools. Laban died in England in 1958.

=== Notable Laban dance students and associates ===
Among Laban's students, friends, and associates were Mary Wigman, Suzanne Perrottet, Katja Wulff, Kurt Jooss, Lisa Ullmann, Albrecht Knust, Dussia Bereska, Lilian Harmel, Sophie Taeuber-Arp, Hilde Holger, Ana Maletić, Milča Mayerová, Gertrud Kraus, Gisa Geert, Warren Lamb, Elizabeth Sneddon, Dilys Price, Yat Malmgren, Sylvia Bodmer, Betty Meredith-Jones, and Irmgard Bartenieff.

== Legacy ==
The Laban Collection in the Laban Archive at Trinity Laban Conservatoire of Music and Dance documents Laban's life and work in the 1920s-1950s. The Rudolf Laban Archive at the National Resource Centre for Dance, collected and organised by Lisa Ullmann and Ellinor Hinks, documents his educational work in the UK and contains many of his original drawings. The John Hodgson Collection in the Brotherton Library at Leeds University holds original documents relating to Laban's career in Europe in the early twentieth century. Other archives holding material about Laban include the Tanzarchiv Leipzig, Dartington Archive, and the German Dance Archives, Cologne.

Laban's students went on to found their own schools of modern dance, influencing their own pupils through the 20th century:

- Rudolf von Laban
  - Kurt Jooss (Ausdruckstanz)
    - Pina Bausch (Tanztheater)
  - Mary Wigman (Expressionist dance)
    - Ursula Cain
      - Heike Hennig (see Dancing with Time)
    - Hanya Holm
      - Valerie Bettis
      - Alwin Nikolais—decentralization
        - Murray Louis
        - Beverly Schmidt Blossom

== Works and publications ==
- (Undated). Harmonie Lehre Der Bewegung (German). (Handwritten copy by Sylvia Bodmer of a book by Rudolf Laban) London: Laban Collection S. B. 48.
- (1920). Die Welt des Taenzers [The world of Dancers] (German). Stuttgart: Walter Seifert. (3rd edition, 1926)
- (1926). Choreographie: Erstes Heft (German). Jena: Eugen Diederichs.
- (1926). Gymnastik und Tanz (German). Oldenburg: Stalling.
- (1926). Des Kindes Gymnastik und Tanz (German). Oldenburg: Stalling.
- (1928). Schrifttanz: Methodik, Orthographie, Erlaeuterungen (German). Vienna: Universal Edition.
- (1929). "Das Choreographische Institut Laban" in Monographien der Ausbildungen fuer Tanz und Taenzerische Koeperbildung (German). Edited by Liesel Freund. Berlin-Charlottenburg: L. Alterthum.
- (1947). with F. C. Lawrence. Effort: Economy of Human Movement London: MacDonald and Evans. (4th reprint 1967)
- (1948). Modern Educational Dance. London: MacDonald and Evans. (2nd Edition 1963, revised by Lisa Ullmann)
- (1948). "President's address at the annual general meeting of the Laban art of movement guild". Laban Art of Movement Guild News Sheet. 1 (April): 5–8.
- (1950). The Mastery of Movement on the Stage. London: MacDonald and Evans.
- (1951). "What has led you to study movement? Answered by R. Laban". Laban Art of Movement Guild News Sheet. 7 (Sept.): 8–11.
- (1952). "The art of movement in the school". Laban Art of Movement Guild News Sheet. 8 (March): 10–16.
- (1956). Laban's Principles of Dance and Movement Notation. London: MacDonald and Evans. (2nd edition 1975, annotated and edited by Roderyk Lange)
- (1960). The Mastery of Movement. (2nd Edition of The Mastery of Movement on the Stage), revised and enlarged by Lisa Ullmann. London: MacDonald and Evans. (3rd Edition, 1971. London: MacDonald and Evans) (1st American Edition, 1971. Boston: Plays) (4th Edition, 1980. Plymouth, UK: Northcote House)
- (1966). Choreutics. Annotated and edited by Lisa Ullmann. London: MacDonald and Evans.
- (1974). The Language of Movement; A Guide Book to Choreutics. Annotated and edited by Lisa Ullmann. Boston: Plays. (American publication of Choreutics)
- (1975). A Life For Dance; Reminiscencs. Translated and annotated by Lisa Ullmann. London: MacDonald & Evans. (Original German published 1935.)
- (1984). A Vision of Dynamic Space. Compiled by Lisa Ullmann. London: The Falmer Press.
