= Warren Lamb =

British management consultant

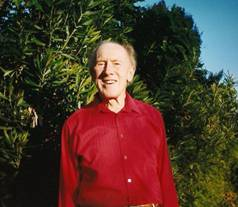
- Born: Warren D. Lamb; 28 April 1923; Wallasey, England
- Died: 21 January 2014 (aged 90)
- Spouse: Barbara Lamb

Warren Lamb (28 April 1923 – 21 January 2014) was a British management consultant and pioneer in the field of nonverbal behavior. After studying with Rudolf Laban he developed Movement Pattern Analysis - a system for analysing and interpreting movement behaviour, which has been applied in numerous fields including management consulting, executive recruitment and therapy. Lamb used the MPA system in advising multinational corporations, typically at top team level, and also government organizations. Lamb differentiated his system from the popular body language literature and argued that the key to interpreting behaviour was not fixed gestures but the dynamics of movement. Lamb's underlying theory was that each individual has a unique way of moving which is constant and that these distinct movement patterns reflect (and predict) the individual's way of thinking and behaving. In MPA he developed a system for identifying these patterns and relating them to behaviours, with the aim of predicting how people will behave in various situations based on their movement patterns. Recent studies led by Harvard University and Brown University in the United States reported significant predictive reliability for the system.

== Early life ==
Warren Lamb was born in Wallasey, near Liverpool. When war broke out in 1939, Lamb joined the Royal Navy at the age of 16. He was on active duty until 1944, mainly serving in the Mediterranean, during which time he participated in numerous military engagements. During one military campaign all the fleet's ships were sunk, with the destroyer in which he was serving being the sole survivor.

== Career ==
After the war Lamb, following advice from his father, joined Lloyds Bank, where he initially expected to develop his career. Lamb by chance heard of a lecture to be given by Rudolf Laban, the German dance pioneer, who had recently moved to England. He attended the lecture and, although he had no prior involvement with the world of dance, was fascinated by what he heard. Soon after he resigned from an apparently secure job at Lloyds Bank to join the Art of Movement Studio in Manchester, a pioneering modern dance school led by Laban and his close associate Lisa Ullmann. He trained in modern dance and performed with the Studio's dance group.

After three years with the Art of Movement Studio, Lamb began to work with Laban and his partner F.C. Lawrence in industry, where the two were pioneering movement notation and analysis. Laban and Lawrence were advising companies that each person has a distinctive and preferred pattern of movement, and that it is more efficient to organize work flows on the factory floor that are in harmony with the individual's natural or preferred way of moving, rather than to organize processes to minimize movements. Lamb assisted with notation of workers' movements, to identify and codify their unique movement patterns, and helped Laban and Lawrence develop a disciplined framework for codifying movement: the Laban Lawrence Personal Effort Assessment.

Building on Laban's theories, Lamb hypothesized that these unique movement patterns may be linked to thought and action processes and therefore the behaviour of executives. Lamb extended movement analysis from the factory floor to the study of managers, often at senior level. From the early 1950s Lamb began to advise executives on their decision making behaviour, based on movement analysis. Clients grew and by the 1960s Lamb was advising a range of household-name companies, including at chief executive level. Lamb later commented that most senior executives were puzzled by the system, but took a practical approach in employing him as they saw results.

In 1958, Rudolf Laban died, and subsequently Lamb focused on the Effort/Shape concept. He contributed to the development of this work along with others who had studied with Laban, including Irmgard Bartenieff and Judith Kestenberg.

== Movement Pattern Analysis ==
Movement Pattern Analysis (earlier known as Action Profiling) was created by Warren Lamb, drawing from the innovations of Laban and Lawrence. It is a theoretical model and assessment technique, used mainly in senior-management consulting and for personal-development. Lamb saw the importance of "affinities" between Effort energy elements triad combinations/ Shape three geometric planes. (See Susan Lovell "Interview with Warren Lamb" American Journal of Dance Therapy, March 1993, p 28. Also "Beyond Dance" Ellen Davies.)

== Publications ==
- Posture and Gesture (1965)
- Management Behavior (Duckworth, 1965, 1969)
- Body Code (Routledge and Kegan Paul, 1979)
