= Ellinor Hinks =

Ellinor Margaret Hinks (6 February 1912 — 18 January 2004) was a Principal of Nonington College of Physical Education in Kent, UK. In her time as Principal, she increased the number of students, expanded the college’s facilities, made it co-educational and built its reputation for dance, gymnastics and movement education. She was a photographer and film maker and is considered a 20th century visionary in physical education.

== Education and career ==
Hinks was educated at Croham Hurst school, Croydon, Surrey where she became head girl. She studied at Bedford College of Physical Education from 1930 to 1933. Her first teaching post was at Queenswood school, Hatfield, Herts where she stayed until 1938. Her second post, from 1938-45, was at Harrow County girls' school. From 1944-1950, she lectured at I. M. Marsh College of Physical Education, Liverpool where she started experimenting with her own approaches to gymnastics. By 1950, Hinks was Deputy Principal at Nonington College of Physical Education in Kent. She became Principal in 1959. At the time, teacher training colleges that specialised in physical education for women were beginning to react against the current Swedish gymnastics system.

In the 1960s, she oversaw a rise in student numbers from 200 to nearly 600. Hinks persuaded the local county council to buy farmland for the establishment of new facilities, such as a gymnasium, for which Hinks designed innovatory equipment, a theatre, a swimming pool, laboratories, a sports hall, and a library, which were all gradually built over the next few years. The library was opened in 1972.

Hinks wanted the college to be co-educational and, in 1966, after years of discussion with the Ministry of Education, the college launched the country's first mixed-sex, physical education teacher training course. Hinks also pressed for acceptance of the idea of Art and Science of Movement and Movement Studies as courses at degree level. By the late 1960s, Bachelor of Education degree courses started at the college, validated by the London University Institute of Education. Hinks made a series of films called ‘Movement in the Making’ which were widely used as teaching aids in colleges and schools.

== Interest in Rudolf von Laban ==
Hinks appointed college staff members Sally Archbutt and Hettie Loman, who were followers of Rudolf von Laban, noted for his analysis and notation of movement and educational dance. Through her interest in the work of these staff members, Hinks became involved in supporting work based on Laban's ideas. She advised Valerie Preston-Dunlop on the development of the Beechmont Movement Centre at Sevenoaks. She gave Archbutt leave to study Kinetography with Albrecht Knust at the Folkwangschule in Essen-Werden, Germany.

Hinks became friends with Lisa Ullmann and Albrecht Knust, and became a member of the International Council of Kinetography Laban (ICKL), advising on the ICKL Constitution. The 1973 Biennial Conference of ICKL was held at Nonington College. Hinks worked with Ullman for many years to sort and catalogue the Laban Archive and continued this work after Ullman’s death. Hinks also became responsible for Ullman’s archive. Both archives are found in The National Resource Centre for Dance in the University of Surrey, Guildford. Hinks helped to set up the Lisa Ullmann Travelling Scholarship Fund (LUTSF), later being its Patron as well as Patron of the Laban Guild.

Hinks was also an artist, as evidenced in her photographic work. She photographed and filmed much of Hettie Loman’s professional choreographic work and helped Archbutt with the Hettie Loman Archive.

== Beyond the college ==
Hinks was the founder President of the Canterbury branch of Soroptimist International from 1961–1963. She retired from Nonington College in 1974. The college was closed down in 1986, due to cuts in higher education funding. Hinks held many positions in the Physical Education/Movement world including: Chair of the Association of Principals of Women's Colleges of Physical Education (1971–74), Chair of the British Council of Physical Education (1973), President of the Physical Education Association of Great Britain and Northern Ireland (1971–74), and chaired ICKL conferences. Hinks was also a Patron and supporter of many organisations including the World Wildlife Fund, National Trust, Royal Horticultural Society, Redwings Horse Sanctuary, RSPCA, Royal Lifeboat Institute, Tollers’ Design Centre, Croham Hurst School, Centre for Dance and Related Arts and the Laban Guild.

== Legacy ==
In 2004, the year of Hinks’ death, a special scholarship was awarded in her memory by LUTSF allowing two women to travel to Bangladesh to visit the Centre for the Rehabilitation of the Paralysed and, the Sreepur Children’s village.
