= Croham Hurst School =

Location
- Croham Road; Croydon, Greater London, CR2 7YN; England

Information
- Type: Private school (now closed)
- Motto: Latin: Finis Coronat Opus (The End Crowns The Work)
- Established: 1899
- Founder: Kathleen Ellis, Theodora Clark
- Closed: 2008
- Local authority: Croydon Council
- Department for Education URN: 101828 Tables
- Gender: Girls
- Age: 3 to 18
- Houses: Balmoral, Caernarvon, Holyrood, Windsor
- Colours: Navy blue and cornflower blue
- Former pupils: Old Crohamians
- Affiliation: Girls' Schools Association
- Website: http://www.crohamhurst.com/

Croham Hurst School was a private day school for junior and senior girls located in South Croydon, England. It was established in 1899, and closed in 2008 when it was absorbed into Old Palace School, Croydon, a constituent school of the Whitgift Foundation.

== History ==
The school was established by Kathleen Ellis in 1899. The second founder, Theodora Clark (of the Clarks shoe manufacturing family) joined Miss Ellis in 1901.

During the Second World War, the school was evacuated to Bridge House, Somerset - where the staff and girls enjoyed the countryside to such an extent that when the Croydon site reopened in 1942 they didn't want to return. However, in 1945 the two schools were reunited on the Croydon site.

Shortly afterwards a Junior School was established, later known as The Limes.

== Premises ==
The principal building of the site (known as the "Main Building") was first occupied in 1907. It housed the Headmistress's office, the Small Hall, various form rooms, and two libraries – the Sixth Form Library, and another dedicated to the memory of Elizabeth Wagstaff (who lost her life in the Second World War). The Small Hall contained memorials of the school's history, including lists of Headmistresses and Head Girls, a plaque commemorating Kathleen Ellis and Theodora Clark, and a stained-glass window of St. Ursula (created by a former pupil and given to the school in 1948). Rising up the hill from the Main Building was the Garden Wing, built in 1973, which housed an English Room, a Drama Room and a room for Mathematics (two of which were also form rooms). To the left of the Garden Wing was the room for Religious Studies (also a form room); and next to it a path (the "Covered Way") up the hill to the Main Assembly Hall, and later to the Centenary Centre for Design and Technology (constructed to celebrate the School's centenary). To the left of this building were the Science Blocks, mainly constructed in 1969; and beyond them the Doreen Seward Centre, including a Music Room and Gymnasium. To the left of the Doreen Seward Centre was the Sixth Form Centre, originally a house, which was bought in 1957. (It then acquired the name of "The Vineyard", after the parable in the Bible in which Ahab desires Naboth's Vineyard to such an extent that his wife, Jezebel, kills the owner to obtain it – although the school did not go to quite these lengths.) The building was for years was used as the science laboratories. Outside this building was a playing field.

== List of Headmistresses ==
- Miss Kathleen Ellis, 1899–1921
- Miss Theodora Clark, 1921–1927
- Miss Berta Humphrey (later Mrs Berta Bywater), 1927–1951
- Miss Florence Ross, 1951–1952
- Miss Stella Wickham (later Mrs Stella Chamberlain), 1952–1959
- Miss Molly Ayre, 1959–1970
- Miss Doreen Seward, 1970–1986
- Miss Joan Shelmerdine, 1986–1994
- Miss Sue Budgen, 1994–2005
- Mrs Jane Abbotts, 2005–2008

== Absorption into Old Palace School ==
In September 2007 it was announced that the Whitgift Foundation would be taking over the school from September 2008, and that it was to merge with Old Palace School. From that date, the senior girls and their staff moved to Old Palace School. The senior school at Croham Hurst became the junior school of Old Palace; and The Limes became a nursery. The Main Building of the school has since been refurbished.

== Notable former pupils ==
- Ida Affleck Graves (1902–1999), author and artist
- Ellinor Hinks (1913–2004), physical educationist. (Note: "Hinks was educated at Croham Hurst school, Croydon, where she became head girl. During her 90th birthday celebration, she noted that it was there that her originality and independence of mind were fostered, and she acquired her lifelong sense of responsibility for her own destiny.")
- Sue Perkins (born 1969), comedian and broadcaster.
- Susanna Reid (born 1970), newsreader.

== Sources ==
- Adenekan, Shemi (7 August 2021). "Sue Perkins' school friendship with Susanna Reid in Croydon". MyLondon.
- "Ellinor Hinks: Obituary". The Guardian. 17 February 2004.
- Sharpe, Monica (5 August 1983). Croham Hurst School, 1899-1999. Phillimore & Co Ltd. ISBN 978-1-86077-084-5.
- Stranack, David (2005). Schools at War: A Story of Education, Evacuation and Endurance in the Second World War. Phillimore. ISBN 978-1-86077-338-9.
- "The Old Palace and Croham Hurst Merger: Three Years On". Your Local Guardian. 1 November 2011. Archived from the original on 1 November 2022.
- "Memorial to child air raid victims". The Daily Telegraph. 14 November 1956. p. 6.
