= Betty Meredith-Jones =

Welsh dance educator

- Betty Meredith-Jones, from a 1955 newspaper
- Born: Betty Marguerita Meredith Jones; 19 May 1908; Aberdare, Wales, U.K.
- Died: 12 May 1996 (aged 87); Swansea, Wales, U.K.
- Occupations: Dancer, dance educator, rehabilitation specialist

Betty Marguerita Meredith-Jones (19 May 1908 – 12 May 1996) was a Welsh dancer, dance educator, and rehabilitation specialist, a student and proponent of the work of Rudolf von Laban.

== Early life and education ==
Meredith-Jones was born in Aberdare, the daughter of William Meredith Jones and Ellen Ada Jones. Her father was a surgeon-dentist for the Aberdare Education Authority. She was presented to Princess Elizabeth in 1939, during the future queen's tour of Wales.

Meredith-Jones trained in dance with Rudolf von Laban, and with the Chartered Society of Massage and Medical Gymnastics. She was a graduate of the Chelsea College of Physical Education. She earned a master's degree at Columbia University. In the 1960s she studied Laban movement analysis with Warren Lamb.

== Career ==
Meredith-Jones taught dance and physical education courses, and choreographed shows for the Salisbury Arts Centre, before 1952, when she moved to the United States to teach movement classes. She created a rehabilitation program at Columbia-Presbyterian Hospital, promoting movement training for addressing Parkinson's disease. She taught at Teachers College, Columbia University, Oregon State University, Stanford University, the University of California, Berkeley, Skidmore College, Duke University, and the New School for Social Research. She also consulted on symbolic movement in liturgical contexts, and taught movement classes for older women.

== Publications ==
- "Understanding Movement" (1955)

== Personal life ==
Meredith-Jones lived in Rhossili in her later years. She died in 1996, at the age of 87, at Singleton Hospital in Swansea. There is a collection of her papers in the National Resource Centre for Dance at the University of Surrey.
