= Harmel =

Harmel is a surname. Notable people with the surname include:

- Heinz Harmel
- Kristin Harmel, American novelist
- Lilian Harmel, Austrian dancer, choreographer, and pedagogue
- Pierre Harmel, Belgian lawyer, politician, and diplomat

It may also refer to Peganum harmala.

== See also ==
- Counts of Harmel
