= Murder of Elianne Andam =

2023 murder of a 15-year-old British girl

- Location: Whitgift Centre, Croydon, London
- Date: 27 September 2023; 8.31am BST
- Attack type: Stabbing
- Weapon: Knife
- Deaths: 1
- Victim: Elianne Andam
- Charges: Murder (initially pleaded guilty to manslaughter)
- Verdict: Guilty
- Convictions: Murder
- Convicted: Hassan Sentamu

On 27 September 2023, Elianne Andam, a 15-year-old British girl, was stabbed to death in Croydon, London by 17-year old Hassan Sentamu. Sentamu was arrested that day and convicted of murder. He was given a life sentence with a minimum term of 23 years in prison.

== Background ==
Elianne Princess Nana Andam was born on 28 June 2008 to Michael and Dorcas Andam (nee Dorcow). She was a 15-year old girl and a Year 11 pupil at Old Palace of John Whitgift School. She was described as much-loved and talented, and had aspired to be a human rights lawyer.

== The event and outcome ==
Elianne Andam was stabbed near the Whitgift Centre in Croydon on the morning of 27 September 2023. Earlier that day, a meeting had been arranged between Hassan Sentamu and his ex-girlfriend to exchange personal belongings, including a teddy bear. Sentamu attended the meeting without the teddy bear and had armed himself with a knife in advance.

Andam accompanied her friend to provide support during the exchange. During the encounter, Andam took a bag of clothes that had been handed to Sentamu and ran away. Sentamu chased after her and stabbed her multiple times. Andam collapsed at the scene and later died from her injuries approximately 50 minutes later, at 9:21 a.m. The attack was recorded on CCTV, and Sentamu was arrested shortly afterwards on the same day.

Sentamu pleaded guilty to manslaughter, with his legal team arguing that he had diminished responsibility due to reduced decision-making capacity associated with autism. The jury rejected this argument and convicted him of murder, and he was given a life sentence with a minimum term of twenty-three years.

== Reactions ==
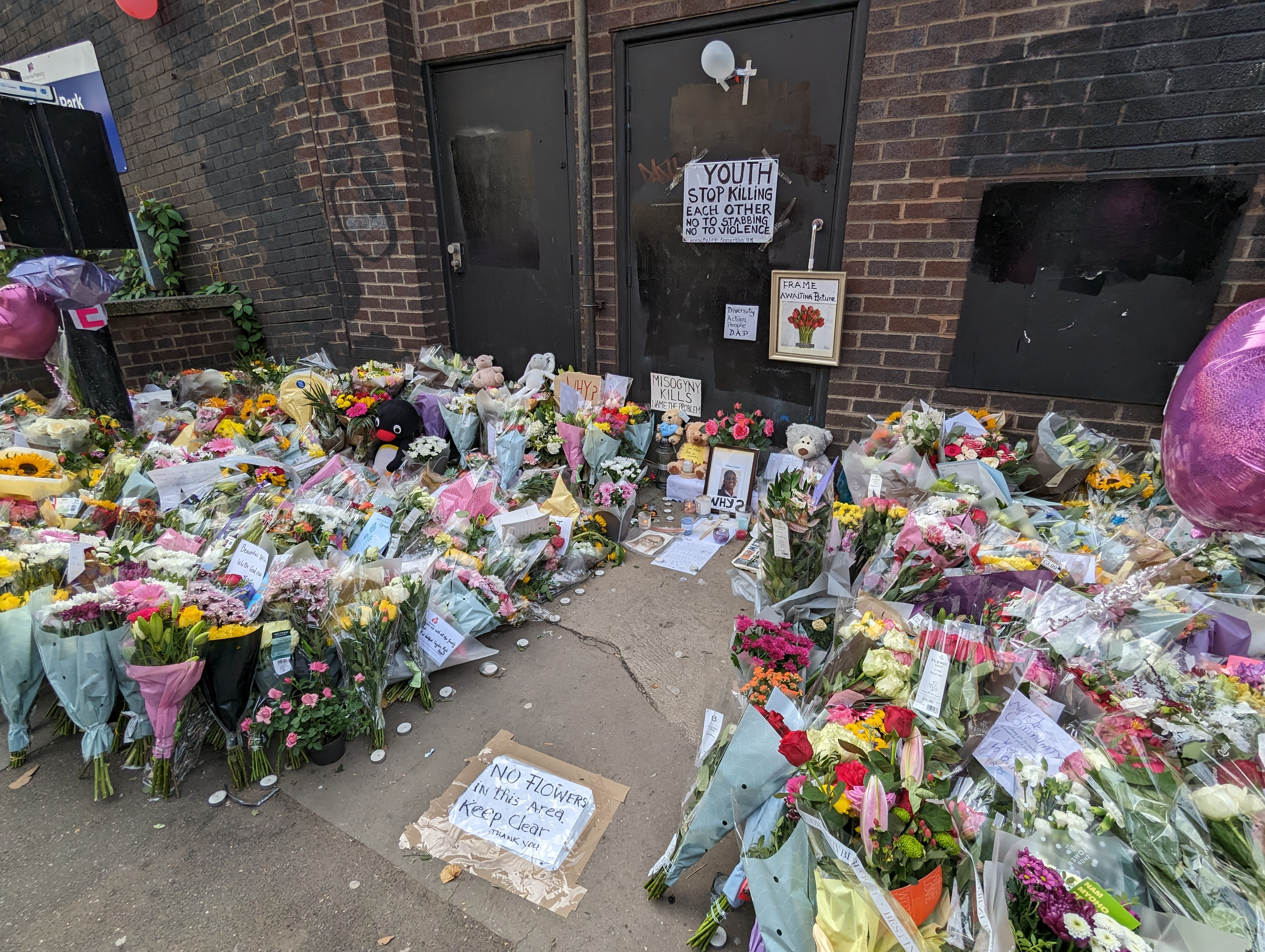
Floral tribute left by the public at the scene of the crime

A candle-lit vigil was held on 4 October 2023 outside the Whitgift Shopping Centre, a week after her death. Thousands of people, many wearing white, attended to pay their respect. Rapper and Croydon native Stormzy joined mourners, standing alongside Andam’s family during prayers.

Andam's killing has been cited as an example of an epidemic of violence against women and girls. Death statistics have been cited that show femicide, including Andam's case, is disproportionately affecting black women.

Her murder was mentioned as one of several killings that inspired Stephen Graham to create the Netflix TV drama series Adolescence, which explores the motivations behind extreme acts of violence against girls by young boys. However, the story is not based on any particular incident, according to co-creator Jack Thorne.
