= Helen Young (weather forecaster) =

English weather forecaster and television presenter

Helen Young (born 10 June 1969) is an English weather forecaster and television presenter.

Born in Crawley, West Sussex, Young attended the Old Palace School in Croydon, where she was later a governor. She then studied geography at University of Bristol, graduating in 1990.

She joined the Met Office as a graduate trainee in 1990. After qualifying as a weather forecaster, she started broadcasting on HTV West as a stand-in, and then appearing as a regular presenter for BBC West.

In November 1993, she joined the BBC Weather Centre as the then youngest BBC weather presenter. She was the main presenter for The Weather Show and also presented the radio series Strange Weather Days, and the weather series for the children's programme Zig-Zag. She was the lead presenter at the BBC Weather Centre from 2002 until 11 November 2005, when she left to become a full-time mother to her young family.

Young is married to a British Airways pilot, and resident in Sutton in south London. Since her retirement from BBC Weather she has co-authored a children's book, Discovery Plus: Weather & Sky. She also acts for the London Borough of Sutton as an Ambassador for the School Travel Plan, leading assemblies and lessons on environmental issues such as weather/climate change, to all age groups from Nursery School children up to learned adults.
