= Modern dance =

Genre of western concert or theatrical dance

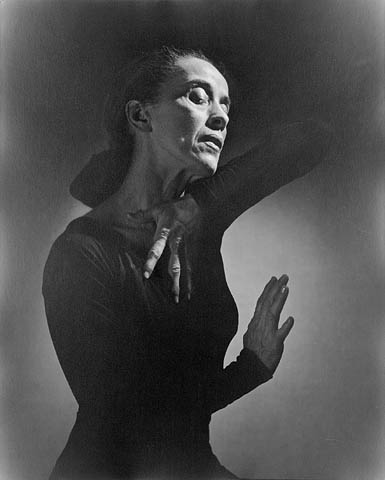
Martha Graham in 1948

Modern dance is a broad genre of western concert or theatrical dance which includes dance styles such as ballet, folk, ethnic, religious, and social dancing; and primarily arose out of Europe and the United States in the late 19th and early 20th centuries. It was considered to have been developed as a rejection of, or rebellion against, classical ballet, and also a way to express social concerns like socioeconomic and cultural factors.

In the late 19th century, modern dance artists such as Isadora Duncan, Maud Allan, and Loie Fuller were pioneering new forms and practices in what is now called improvisational or free dance. These dancers disregarded ballet's strict movement vocabulary (the particular, limited set of movements that were considered proper to ballet) and stopped wearing corsets and pointe shoes in the search for greater freedom of movement.

Throughout the 20th century sociopolitical concerns, major historical events, and the development of other art forms contributed to the continued development of modern dance in the United States and Europe. Moving into the 1960s, new ideas about dance began to emerge as a response to earlier dance forms and to social changes. Eventually, postmodern dance artists would reject the formalism of modern dance, and include elements such as performance art, contact improvisation, release technique, and improvisation.

American modern dance can be divided (roughly) into three periods or eras. In the Early Modern period (c. 1880–1923), characterized by the work of Isadora Duncan, Loie Fuller, Ruth St. Denis, Ted Shawn, and Eleanor King, artistic practice changed radically, but clearly distinct modern dance techniques had not yet emerged. In the Central Modern period (c. 1923–1946), choreographers Martha Graham, Doris Humphrey, Katherine Dunham, Charles Weidman, and Lester Horton sought to develop distinctively American movement styles and vocabularies, and developed clearly defined and recognizable dance training systems. In the Late Modern period (c. 1946–1957), José Limón, Pearl Primus, Merce Cunningham, Talley Beatty, Erick Hawkins, Anna Sokolow, Anna Halprin, and Paul Taylor introduced clear abstractionism and avant-garde movements, and paved the way for postmodern dance.

Modern dance has evolved with each subsequent generation of participating artists. Artistic content has morphed and shifted from one choreographer to another, as have styles and techniques. Artists such as Graham and Horton developed techniques in the Central Modern period that are still taught worldwide and numerous other types of modern dance exist today.

== Background ==
Modern dance is often considered to have emerged as a rejection of, or rebellion against, classical ballet, although historians have suggested that socioeconomic changes in both the United States and Europe helped to initiate shifts in the dance world. In America, increasing industrialization, the rise of a middle class (which had more disposable income and free time), and the decline of Victorian social strictures led to, among other changes, a new interest in health and physical fitness. "It was in this atmosphere that a 'new dance' was emerging as much from a rejection of social structures as from a dissatisfaction with ballet." During that same period, "the champions of physical education helped to prepare the way for modern dance, and gymnastic exercises served as technical starting points for young women who longed to dance." Women's colleges began offering "aesthetic dance" courses by the end of the 1880s. Emil Rath, who wrote at length about this emerging art form at the time stated,

"Music and rhythmic bodily movement are twin sisters of art, as they have come into existence simultaneously...today we see in the artistic work of Isadora Duncan, Maud Allan, and others the use of a form of dancing which strives to portray in movements what the music master expresses in his compositions—interpretative dancing."

=== Free dance ===
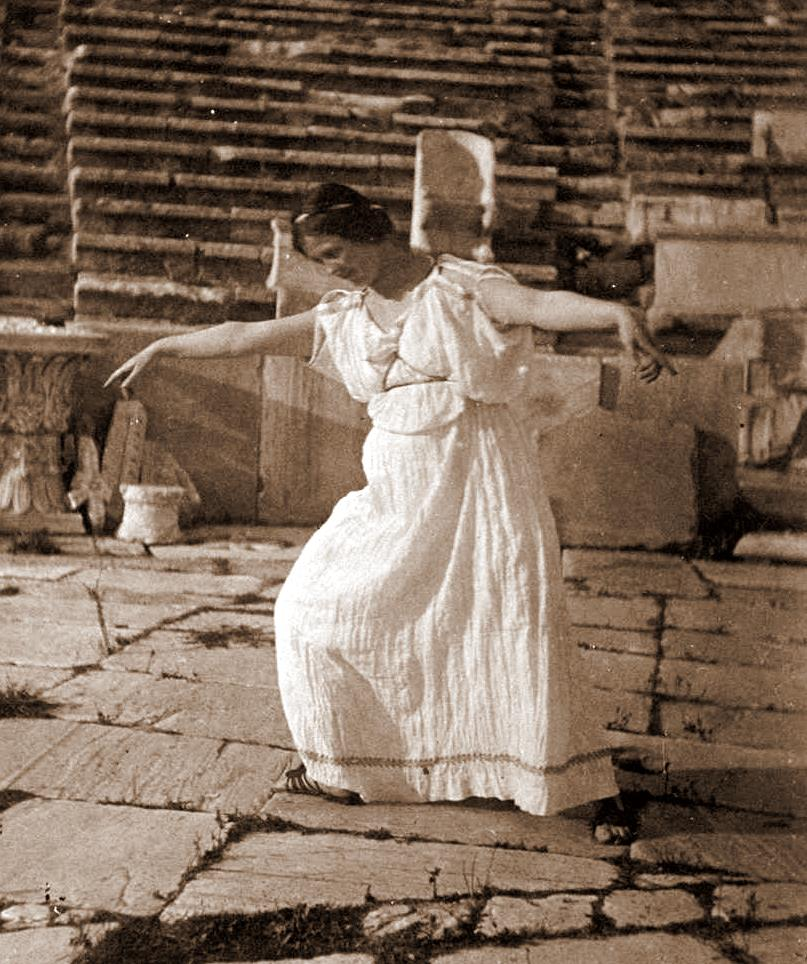
Isadora Duncan in 1903

- Isadora Duncan (born in 1877) was a predecessor of modern dance with her stress on the center or torso, bare feet, loose hair, free-flowing costumes, and incorporation of humor into emotional expression. She was inspired by classical Greek arts, folk dances, social dances, nature, natural forces, and new American athleticism such as skipping, running, jumping, leaping, and abrupt movements. She thought that ballet was ugly and meaningless gymnastics. Although she returned to the United States at various points in her life, her work was not well received there. She returned to Europe and died in Nice in 1927.
- Loie Fuller (born in 1862) was a burlesque "skirt" dancer experimenting with the effect that gas lighting had on her silk costumes. Fuller developed a form of natural movement and improvisation techniques that were used in conjunction with her revolutionary lighting equipment and translucent silk costumes. She patented her apparatus and methods of stage lighting, that included the use of coloured gels and burning chemicals for luminescence, and her voluminous silk stage costumes.
- Ruth St. Denis (born in 1879) influenced by the actress Sarah Bernhardt and Japanese dancer Sada Yacco, developed her translations of Indian culture and mythology. Her performances quickly became popular and she toured extensively while researching Asian culture and arts.

== Expressionist and early modern dance in Europe ==
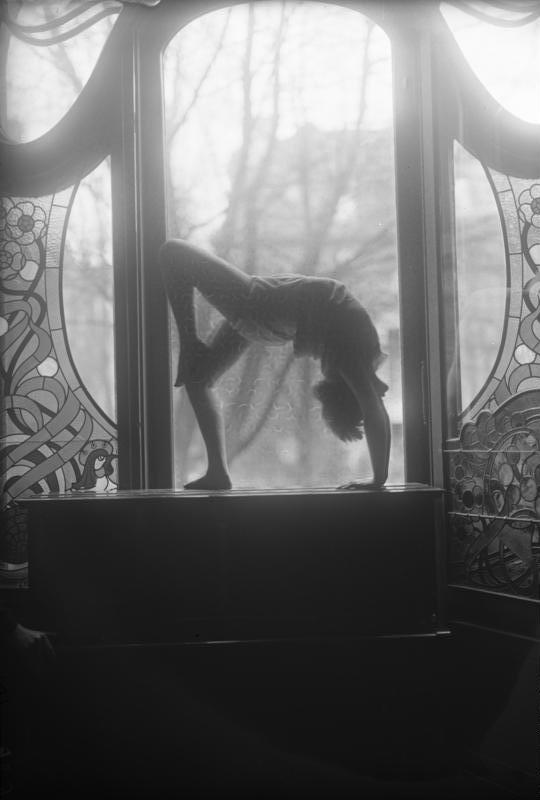
Dancer at the Laban school, Berlin 1929

In Europe, Mary Wigman in Germany, Francois Delsarte, Émile Jaques-Dalcroze (Eurhythmics), and Rudolf Laban developed theories of human movement and expression, and methods of instruction that led to the development of European modern and Expressionist dance. Other pioneers included Kurt Jooss (Ausdruckstanz) and Harald Kreutzberg.

== Radical dance ==
Disturbed by the Great Depression and the rising threat of fascism in Europe, the radical dancers tried to raise consciousness by dramatizing the economic, social, ethnic and political crises of their time.

- Hanya Holm – A student of Mary Wigman and an instructor at the Wigman School in Dresden, founded the New York Wigman School of Dance in 1931 (which became the Hanya Holm Studio in 1936) introducing Wigman technique, Rudolf Laban's theories of spatial dynamics, and later her own dance techniques to American modern dance. An accomplished choreographer, she was a founding artist of the first American Dance Festival in Bennington (1934). Holm's dance work Metropolitan Daily was the first modern dance composition to be televised on NBC and her labanotation score for Kiss Me, Kate (1948) was the first choreography to be copyrighted in the United States. Holm choreographed extensively in the fields of concert dance and musical theater.
- Anna Sokolow – A student of Martha Graham and Louis Horst, Sokolow created her own dance company (c. 1930). Presenting dramatic contemporary imagery, Sokolow's compositions were generally abstract, often revealing the full spectrum of human experience reflecting the tension and alienation of the time and the truth of human movement.
- José Limón – In 1946, after studying and performing with Doris Humphrey and Charles Weidman, Limón established his own company with Humphrey as artistic director. It was under her mentorship that Limón created his signature dance The Moor's Pavane (1949). Limón's choreographic works and technique remain a strong influence on contemporary dance practice.
- Merce Cunningham – A former ballet student and performer with Martha Graham, he presented his first New York solo concert with John Cage in 1944. Influenced by Cage and embracing modernist ideology using postmodern processes, Cunningham introduced chance procedures and pure movement to choreography and Cunningham technique to the cannon of 20th-century dance techniques. Cunningham set the seeds for postmodern dance with his non-linear, non-climactic, non-psychological abstract work. In these works each element is in and of itself expressive, and the observer (in large part) determines what it communicates.
- Erick Hawkins – A student of George Balanchine, became a soloist and the first male dancer in Martha Graham's dance company. In 1951, Hawkins, interested in the new field of kinesiology, opened his own school and developed his own technique (Hawkins technique) a forerunner of most somatic dance techniques.
- Paul Taylor – A student of the Juilliard School of Music and the Connecticut College School of Dance. In 1952 his performance at the American Dance Festival attracted the attention of several major choreographers. Performing in the companies of Merce Cunningham, Martha Graham, and George Balanchine (in that order), he founded the Paul Taylor Dance Company in 1954. The use of everyday gestures and modernist ideology is characteristic of his choreography. Former members of the Paul Taylor Dance Company included Twyla Tharp, Laura Dean, Dan Wagoner, and Senta Driver.
- Alwin Nikolais – A student of Hanya Holm. Nikolais use of multimedia in works such as Masks, Props, and Mobiles (1953), Totem (1960), and Count Down (1979) was unmatched by other choreographers. Often presenting his dancers in constrictive spaces and costumes with complicated sound and sets, he focused their attention on the physical tasks of overcoming obstacles he placed in their way. Nikolais viewed the dancer not as an artist of self-expression, but as a talent who could investigate the properties of physical space and movement.

== In the United States ==
=== Early modern dance ===
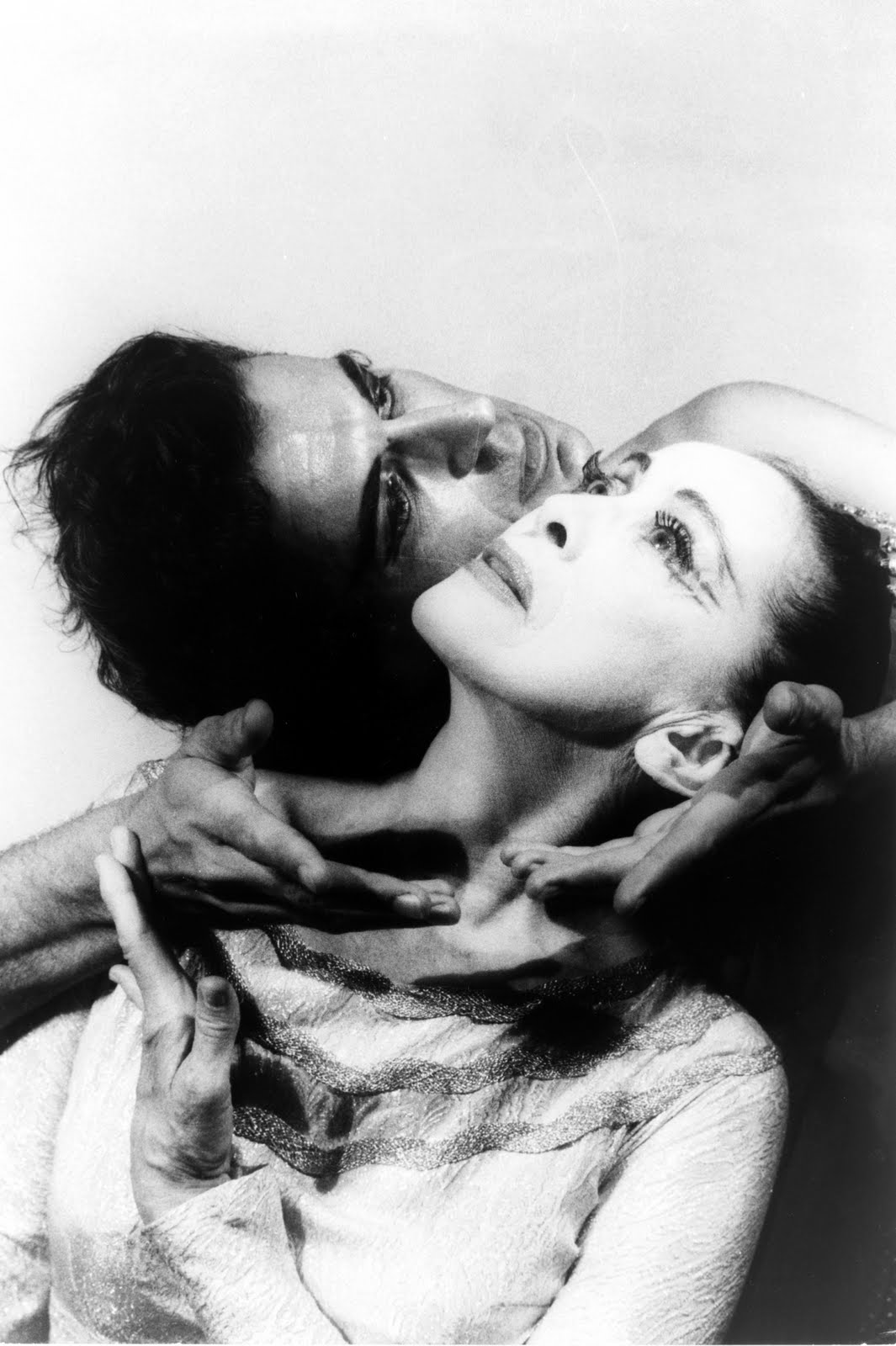
Martha Graham and Bertram Ross in 1961; photo by Carl van Vechten

In 1915, Ruth St. Denis founded the Denishawn school and dance company with her husband Ted Shawn. Martha Graham, Doris Humphrey, and Charles Weidman were pupils at the school and members of the dance company. Seeking a wider and more accepting audience for their work, Duncan, Fuller, and Ruth St. Denis toured Europe. Martha Graham is often regarded as the founding mother of modern 20th-century concert dance.

Graham viewed ballet as too one-sided: European, imperialistic, and un-American. She became a student at the Denishawn school in 1916 and then moved to New York City in 1923, where she performed in musical comedies, music halls, and worked on her own choreography. Graham developed her own dance technique, Graham technique, that hinged on concepts of contraction and release. In Graham's teachings, she wanted her students to "Feel". To "Feel", means having a heightened sense of awareness of being grounded to the floor while, at the same time, feeling the energy throughout your entire body, extending it to the audience. Her principal contributions to dance are the focus of the 'center' of the body (as contrast to ballet's emphasis on limbs), coordination between breathing and movement, and a dancer's relationship with the floor.

=== Popularization ===
In 1927, newspapers regularly began assigning dance critics, such as Walter Terry, and Edwin Denby, who approached performances from the viewpoint of a movement specialist rather than as a reviewer of music or drama. Educators accepted modern dance into college and university curricula, first as a part of physical education, then as performing art. Many college teachers were trained at the Bennington Summer School of the Dance, established at Bennington College in 1934.

Of the Bennington program, Agnes de Mille wrote, "...there was a fine commingling of all kinds of artists, musicians, and designers, and secondly, because all those responsible for booking the college concert series across the continent were assembled there. ... free from the limiting strictures of the three big monopolistic managements, who pressed for preference of their European clients. As a consequence, for the first time American dancers were hired to tour America nationwide, and this marked the beginning of their solvency."

=== African American ===
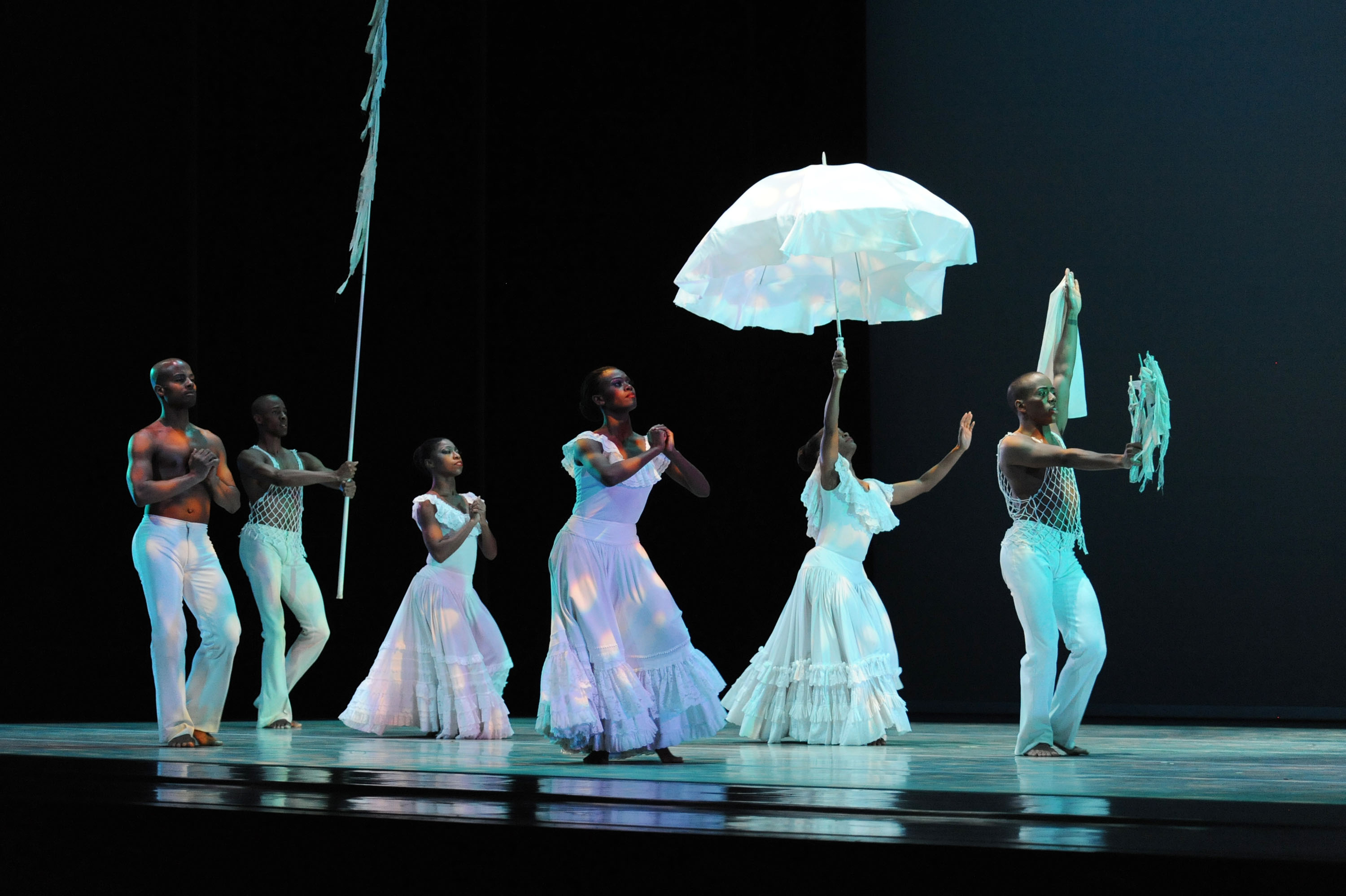
Alvin Ailey American Dance Theater perform Revelations in 2011.

African American dance blended modern dance with African and Caribbean movement (flexible torso and spine, articulated pelvis, isolation of the limbs, and polyrhythmic movement). Katherine Dunham trained in ballet, founded Ballet Negre in 1936 and then the Katherine Dunham Dance Company based in Chicago. In 1945, she opened a school in New York, teaching Katherine Dunham Technique, African and Caribbean movement integrated with ballet and modern dance. Taking inspiration from African-based dance where one part of the body plays against one another, she focused on articulating the torso in her choreography. Pearl Primus drew on African and Caribbean dances to create strong dramatic works characterized by large leaps. She often based her dances on the work of black writers and on racial issues, such as Langston Hughes's 1944 The Negro Speaks of Rivers, and Lewis Allan's 1945 Strange Fruit (1945). Her dance company developed into the Pearl Primus Dance Language Institute. Alvin Ailey studied under Lester Horton, Bella Lewitzky, and later Martha Graham. He spent several years working in both concert and theater dance. In 1958, Ailey and a group of young African-American dancers performed as the Alvin Ailey American Dance Theater in New York. He drew upon his "blood memories" of Texas, the blues, spirituals and gospel as inspiration. His most popular and critically acclaimed work is Revelations (1960).

== Legacy of modern dance ==
The legacy of modern dance can be seen in lineage of 20th-century concert dance forms. Although often producing divergent dance forms, many seminal dance artists share a common heritage that can be traced back to free dance.

=== Postmodern dance ===
Postmodern dance developed in the 1960s in United States when society questioned truths and ideologies in politics and art. This period was marked by social and cultural experimentation in the arts. Choreographers no longer created specific 'schools' or 'styles'. The influences from different periods of dance became more vague and fragmented.

=== Contemporary dance ===
Danceworks rehearsal of Stone Soup in 2011 with semi-improvised music from composer Seth Warren-Crow and Apple iLife sound clip "Tour Bus"

Contemporary dance emerged in the 1950s as the dance form that is combining the modern dance elements and the classical ballet elements. It can use elements from non-Western dance cultures, such as African dancing with bent knees as a characteristic trait, and Butoh, Japanese contemporary dancing that developed in the 1950s. It incorporates modern European influences, via the work of pioneers like Isadora Duncan.

According to Treva Bedinghaus, "Modern dancers use dancing to express their innermost emotions, often to get closer to their inner-selves. Before attempting to choreograph a routine, the modern dancer decides which emotions to try to convey to the audience. Many modern dancers choose a subject near and dear to their hearts, such as a lost love or a personal failure. The dancer will choose music that relates to the story they wish to tell, or choose to use no music at all, and then choose a costume to reflect their chosen emotions."

== Teachers and their students ==
This list illustrates some important teacher-student relationships in modern dance.

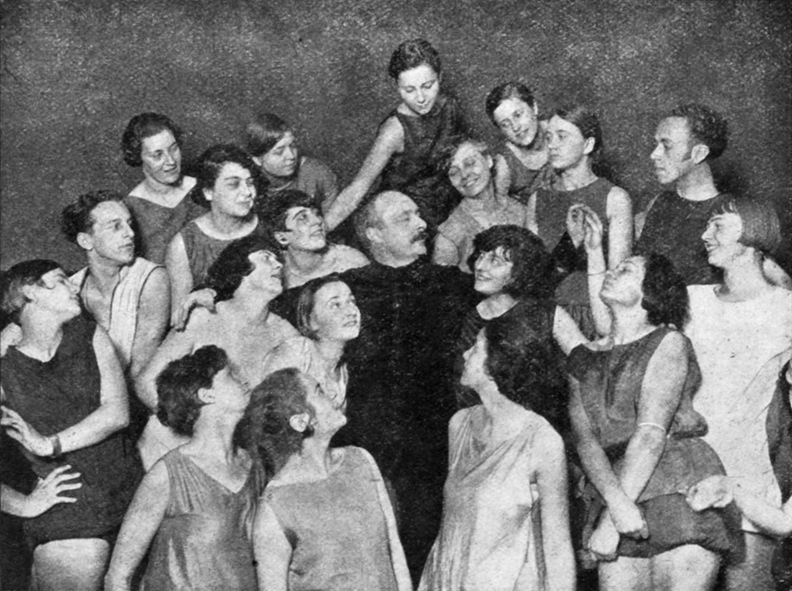
Rudolf von Laban and pupils at his dance school, Berlin 1929

- Loie Fuller
- Isadora Duncan—Duncan technique
- Grete Wiesenthal
- Ruth St. Denis
  - Ted Shawn—Shawn Fundamentals
  - Denishawn (school and company)
    - Doris Humphrey and Charles Weidman—The Art of Making Dances (Humphrey)
      - Humphrey-Weidman school—Humphrey-Weidman technique (fall and recovery)
        - José Limón—Limón technique
    - Martha Graham—Graham technique (and Louis Horst)
      - Erick Hawkins (via George Balanchine)—Hawkins technique
      - Anna Sokolow
      - May O'Donnell
      - Merce Cunningham—Cunningham technique (also see Postmodern dance)
        - Yvonne Rainer
        - Margaret Jenkins
        - Steve Paxton
        - Richard Alston
      - Paul Taylor
        - Twyla Tharp
      - Trisha Brown
      - Ohad Naharin
- Lester Horton—"Horton Technique"
  - Bella Lewitzky
  - Alvin Ailey
- Rudolf von Laban
  - Kurt Jooss (Ausdruckstanz)
    - Pina Bausch (Tanztheater)
  - Mary Wigman (Expressionist dance)
    - Ursula Cain
      - Heike Hennig (see Dancing with Time)
    - Hanya Holm
      - Valerie Bettis
      - Alfred Brooks
      - Maxine Munt
      - Alwin Nikolais—decentralization
        - Murray Louis
        - Beverly Schmidt Blossom
- Émile Jaques-Dalcroze
  - Mary Wigman
  - Marie Rambert
- Katherine Dunham—Katherine Dunham Technique
- Pearl Primus
  - Garth Fagan
- Helen Tamiris
  - Daniel Nagrin

== See also ==
- Concert dance
- List of dance styles
- Women in dance
