= Valerie Preston-Dunlop =

Valerie Preston-Dunlop is a British dancer. She is a consultant and Honorary Fellow at London's Trinity Laban Conservatoire of Music and Dance. She conducted extensive research in the life and work of Rudolf Laban. She has written many books and directed DVDs that have contributed to the field of dance. She is a teacher, researcher, and dance scholar.

== Dance career and research ==
Aged 16, she began her training in 1947 under Rudolf Laban in Manchester at the Art of Movement Studio, on completion receiving a Laban Diploma. The Art of Movement Studio became The Laban Centre for Movement and Dance in 1970 and amalgamated with Trinity College of Music in 2002 to become Trinity Laban Conservatoire of Music and Dance.

She attended the School of Russian Ballet in London and worked with Albrecht Knust and Kurt Jooss at the Folkwangschule in Essen. She has an MA in movement studies and her PhD in choreography. She performed with British Dance Theatre (1949 – 1952). From 1953, she trained dance students in Colleges of Education.

She opened Beechmont Movement Study Centre (1967–71) providing specialist courses in dance and dance notation (Labanotation and Motif Writing) and collaborating with Her Majesty's Inspectors of Education on the possibility of designing the first BA degree course in Dance in the UK.

After a short break for her family (she has a son and daughter), she retrained (1967–81) gaining an Adv Diploma in Education, an MA (dist) in Movement Studies and a PhD in Choreology concurrently teaching and researching at the Laban Centre for Movement and Dance until 2008.

Preston-Dunlop's most recent work has focused on Laban's dance theatre works where, with collaboration from dance and music artists at Trinity Laban Conservatoire of Music and Dance, she directed dance works from Laban's repertoire from the 1920s.

Her most recent DVD, In Memoriam (2014), a movement choir for all ages, was made in the memorial year for the First World War. She featured throughout the BBC 4 documentary Dance Rebels (2015).

Preston-Dunlop's AHRC funded research (2008) enabled her to create interactive maps of the multimedia creative processes in William Forsythe's The Loss of Small Detail. She has established Choreological Studies as a key discipline for the integrated practical/theoretical study of dance as a theatre art.

Her books on dance practice and on Rudolf Laban are key texts in Performing Arts departments in the UK and abroad

== Publications ==
=== Books ===
- Handbook for Modern Educational Dance (1963), published as Dance in Education (1980)
- Practical Kinetography Laban (1969)
- Dance is a Language, isn't it? (1979)
- Dancing and Dance Theory (1980) - Conference Papers
- Schrifttanz: A View of Dance in the Weimar Republic (1990) with Susanne Lahusen. Translations of articles from Schrifttanz 1928-32
- Dance Words (1995)
- Rudolf Laban: An Extraordinary Life (1998)
- Looking at Dances (1998)
- Dance and the performative: a Choreological Perspective – Laban and Beyond (2002).
- Rudolf Laban: Man of Theatre Dance Books Ltd. (2013)
- Moving with the Times, Noverre Press (2017)

=== Videos ===
- Living Architecture (2008)
- Die Grünen Clowns 1928 to Green Clowns 2008 (2009)
- Rudolf Laban's Nacht (2012)
- Laban's Solos and Duos 1924 (2012)
- Laban's Der Schwingende Tempel (2013)
- In Memoriam 2014 (2014)

=== Articles ===
- 'Rudolf Laban's Cultural Environment', Working Papers, I. 1987.
- 'Laban and the Nazis: Towards an Understanding of Rudolf Laban and the Third Reich', Dance Theatre Journal, Vol 6 No 2. 1988.
- 'Choreological Studies, 1928 and 1988', Movement and Dance, No 77, May. 1988.
- 'Rudolf Laban: the seminal years in Munich, 1910–14' Dance Theatre Journal Vol 7, Nos 3 and 4. 1989.
- 'Laban in Zurich, 1914–1919: the nightmare years', Dance Theatre Journal, Vol 10 No 3. 1993.
- 'Dance Dynamics', Dance Theatre Journal, Vol 13 No 2. 1996.
- 'Symbolism and the European dance revolution', Dance Theatre Journal, Vol 14 No 3. 1998.
- "Choreutics" in Dick McCaw, (ed) Laban Sourcebook, Routledge, 2011
- "Gained in Translation: Recreation as Creative Practice" with Lesley-Anne Sayers in Dance Chronicle 34: 5-45, (Routledge 2014)
- "Notes on Bodies in Dada" with Val Rimmer in Stephen Foster (ed) Dada: The Coordinates of Cultural Politics (GKHall &Co 1996)
