= Dilys Price =

Welsh educator, parachutist, and model (1932–2020)

Dilys Price OBE (3 June 1932 – 9 October 2020) was a Welsh educator, parachutist, and model who held the record for the oldest female solo parachute jump at the age of 80. She founded the charity Touch Trust to provide art and creative movement activities.

== Career ==
Until retirement Price was a senior lecturer at the Cardiff College of Education. She specialised in the art of movement and dance and had been taught by Rudolph Laban. From the 1970s she had become involved in applying her knowledge to the education of children and adults with special needs. Her innovations led to a new major option course in Adaptive Physical Education for Special Needs in the Physical Education Department at her college in the 1980s. She was a member of the team that led to the opening of the Wales Sports Centre for the Disabled in the (now) Cardiff Metropolitan University in 1996.

Price founded the Touch Trust in 1996, which became a registered charity in 2000. The objective was movement education for people with autism, dementia and profound disabilities. She retired from any day-to-day role in the charity in 2015 but continued fundraising.

Price took up parachuting in 1986 and trained in the United States. She carried out more than 1,130 solo jumps around the globe. She specialised in the aesthetic maneuvers of freestyling and air acrobatics while falling. In 2000 she gained a silver medal at the British Parachute National competition for freestyle. She acquired the name "Daredevil Dilys". She made one jump from 28,000 ft (8,500 m) which required an oxygen supply. On 13 April 2013 she carried out a parachute jump from Langar Airfield, Nottingham, UK, when she was 80 years and 315 days old which made her the oldest solo woman parachutist. This record still stood at the time of her death in 2020. After the 2013 jump, Price stopped doing solo jumps and sold her parachute when she was aged 86. Her parachute jumps raised thousands of pounds for charity. In 2017 she gave a TEDx talk in Cardiff about her parachuting.

In 2018 Price acted as a model for the Helmut Lang fashion brand in its 'Women of Wales' autumn collection.

== Personal life ==
Price was born 3 June 1932. Price married, had a son and later divorced. She died in October 2020.

== Awards and honours ==
Price was appointed an OBE in 2003 for services to people with special needs. In 2017 she was singled out for special recognition for her work at the Pride of Britain Awards. In 2018, she was included by Wales' Women's Equality Network among 50 living women who have influenced Welsh life. She was made an honorary fellow at University of Wales Trinity Saint David in July 2018 and also Cardiff Metropolitan University.
