= Old Palace School =

Old Palace of John Whitgift School

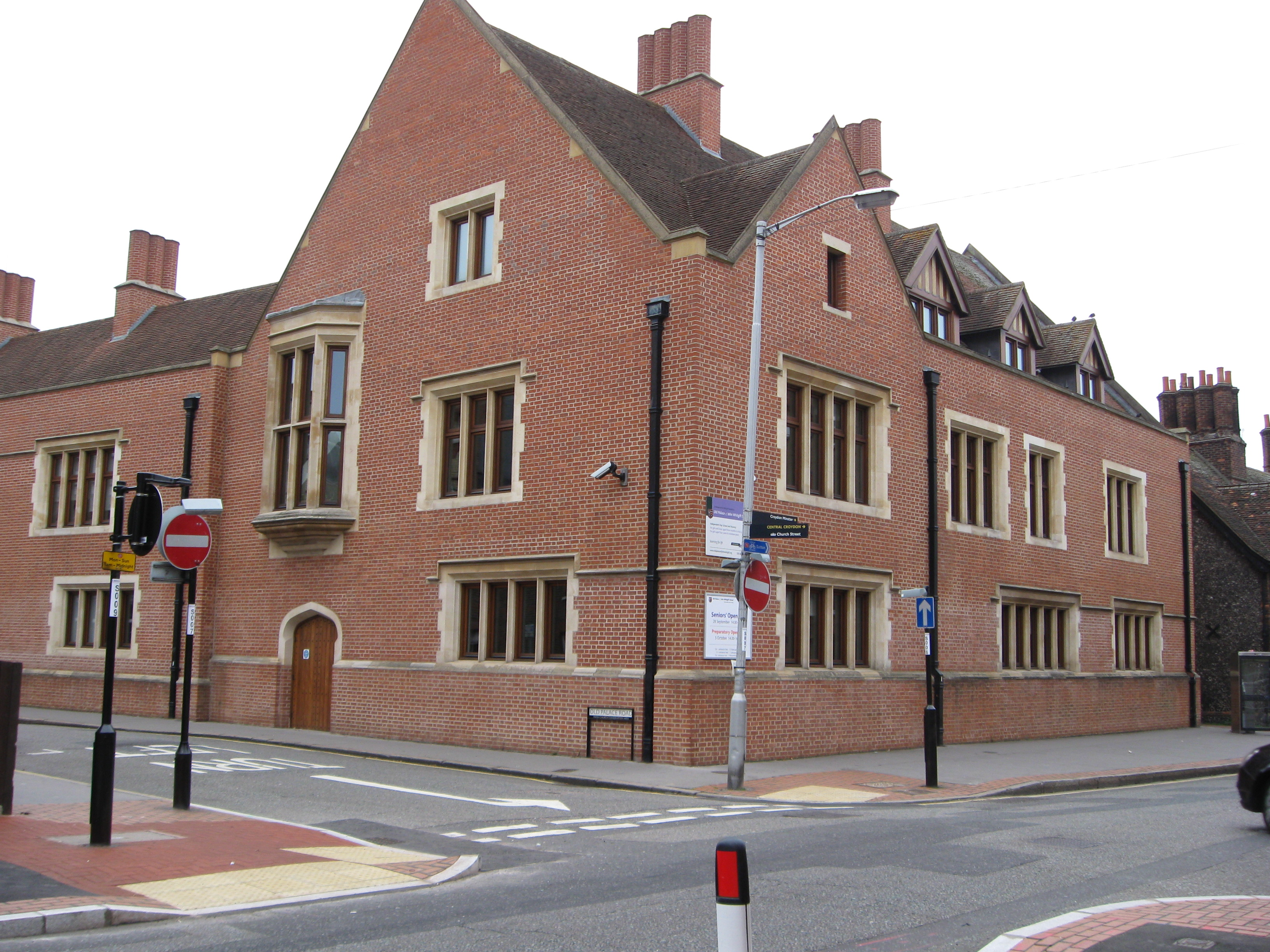

Location
- Old Palace Road; Croydon, Greater London, CR0 1AX; England; 51°22′22″N 0°06′18″W

Information
- Type: Private school
- Motto: Latin: Pro Ecclesia Dei (For the Church of God)
- Established: 1889; 137 years ago
- Founder: Order of the Community of the Sisters of the Church
- Department for Education URN: 101846 Tables
- Head teacher: Andrew Christie
- Gender: Girls
- Age: 3 to 18
- Enrolment: c. 870
- Houses: Stafford; Laud; Hatton; Anselm
- Colours: Green and Purple (formerly Brown and Green)
- Affiliation: Whitgift Foundation
- Alumnae: Old Palace Old Girls
- Website: www.oldpalace.croydon.sch.uk

Listed Building – Grade I
- Official name: Old Palace School (Croydon Palace)
- Designated: 29 January 1951
- Reference no.: 1079296

The Old Palace of John Whitgift School was a selective independent school for girls in Croydon, London. It was founded in 1889, and closed in July 2025. It was based in the Old Palace in Old Town, a Grade I listed building.

It consisted of a pre-school for pupils aged 3–4, a preparatory department for pupils aged 4–11, and a senior school for pupils aged 11–18. The school was operated by the Whitgift Foundation, along with Whitgift School and the Trinity School of John Whitgift.

== History ==
The school was founded in 1889 by the Sisters of the Church. The "Old Palace" itself was for 500 years the summer residence of the Archbishops of Canterbury. In the 19th century the Archbishops ended their residence at Croydon Palace and used Addington Palace, also in Croydon, instead. The Palace was sold and subsequently used as a bleaching factory, amongst other things. The building was rescued by the Duke of Newcastle-under-Lyne in 1887 and given to the Sisters of the Church, who used it for educational purposes.

In 1945, the school became a Direct Grant Grammar School and in 1975, became a fully independent day school for girls. The school joined the Whitgift Foundation in 1993. The school merged with Croham Hurst School, a former private girls' school, in 2008.

In September 2023, Whitgift Foundation announced the decision to close the school permanently in August 2025 owing to financial difficulties.

== Premises ==
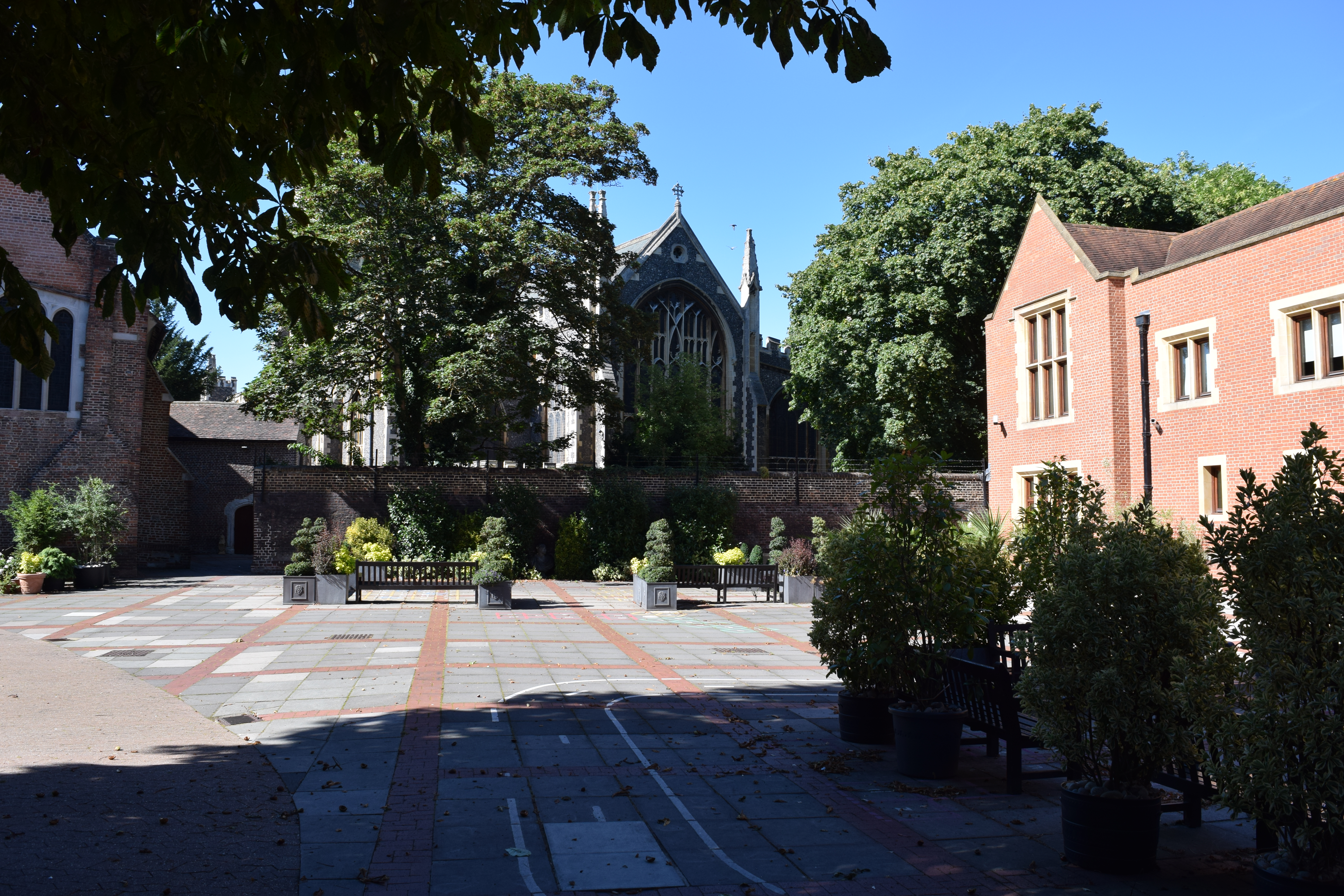
School grounds, with Croydon Minster in the background

The senior school building was for centuries the summer palace of the Archbishops of Canterbury. It began life as the manor house, part wooden from at least the 12th century, and stone from the 14th century. The core of today's palace was built in the 15th century. The guardroom – once a reception room, later a library – dates from the time of Archbishop Thomas Arundel (1396–1414), and is one of the earliest uses of brick in Britain. Archbishop John Stafford (died 1452) built what is now one of the finest medieval great halls left in southern England. A number of monarchs from Henry VI to Elizabeth I banqueted under its high arched-brace roof, each sitting on Stafford's stone throne, part of which survives against the west wall. Elizabeth made numerous visits, and her bed, always travelling with her, was set down in what is now known as Queen Elizabeth's room, a large 15th-century first-floor space, with moulded ceiling joists. The chapel dates from the 15th century, and includes a gallery pew in dark oak often referred to as "Queen Elizabeth's Pew", built by Archbishop William Laud. Beneath this is a Norman font gifted in Victorian times from St George's Church, Southwark, the same font where Charles Dickens had Little Dorrit christened.

The senior school also housed modern, purpose-built facilities including seven laboratories, a heated indoor swimming pool, and an Art and Technology building. In 2001 a building for the Junior Department and one housing the Sixth Form and P.E. area were opened. The school also enjoyed access to Whitgift Foundation grounds and facilities.

Following the school's closure in 2025, the main campus (including the Great Hall, the Old Palace, the Science Block, and the Cathedral Building) was sold to the Curwen Group private equity firm, and leased to Serenity Education Group, which opened a special educational needs school on the site.

The pre-school and preparatory school occupied a separate site to the senior school, in the former Croham Hurst School buildings on Melville Avenue in South Croydon. This site was purchased in 2025 by BAPS Swaminarayan Sanstha, a Hindu fellowship.

== Notable alumnae ==
- Jane Featherstone – television producer
- Sarah Jones – Labour MP for Croydon Central 2017–2024 and Croydon West from 2024, Minister of State for Industry from 2024
- Violet Piercy – runner
- Jane Steen – Church of England Bishop of Lynn in Norfolk
- Helen Young – weather forecaster and television presenter
- Afua Kyei − Chief Financial Officer and executive director of the Bank of England
- Elianne Andam (2008-2023) - schoolgirl murdered outside the Whitgift Centre, Croydon.
- Meredith Kercher (1985-2007) - student murdered in Perugia, Italy.

== Houses ==
All students were assigned to one of four houses named after notable people associated with the palace. The houses, and their colours, were Anselm (yellow), Hatton (green), Laud (purple), and Stafford (blue).
