= Lisa Ullmann =

German-British dance and movement teacher

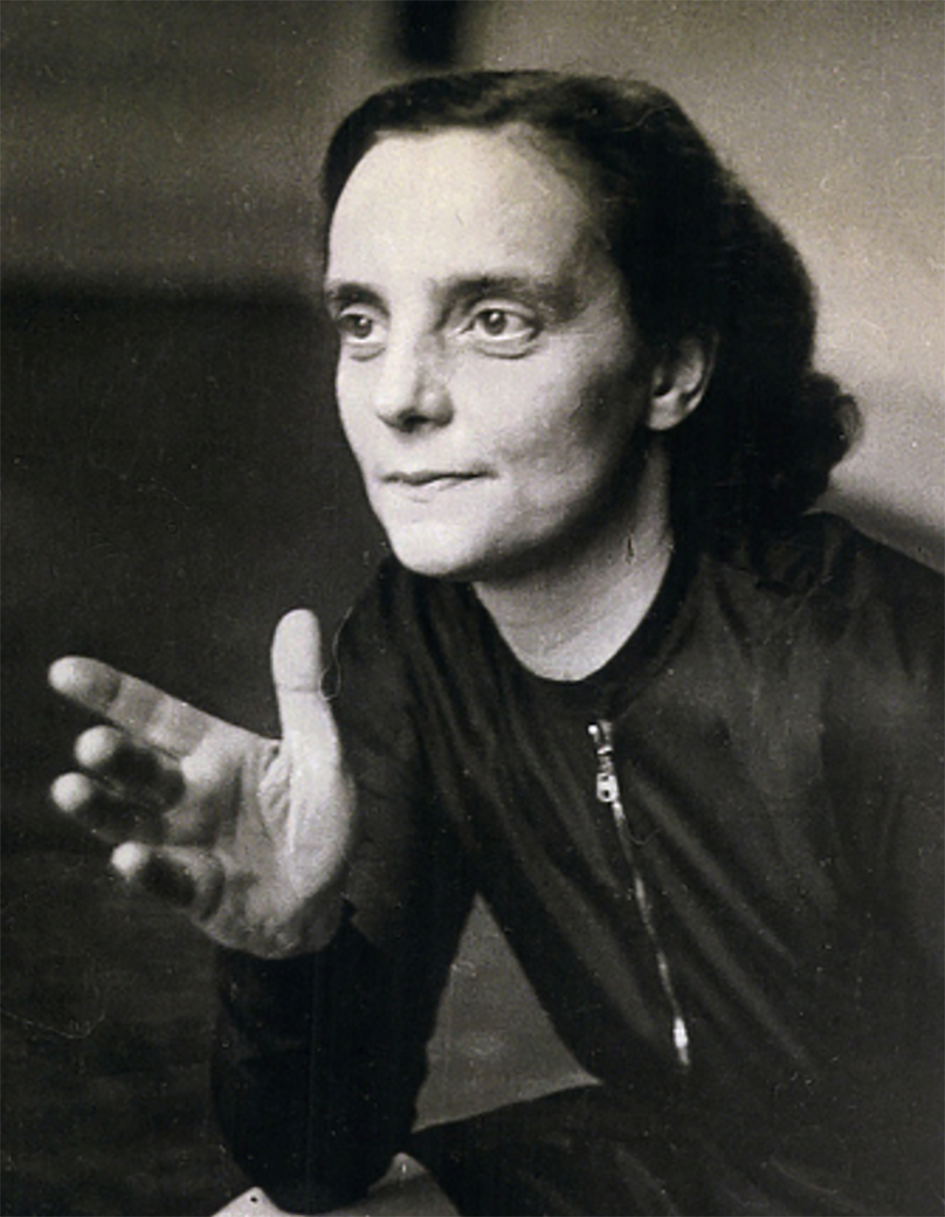
Lisa Ullmann portrait, taken at Art of Movement Studio, Manchester, UK.

Lisa Ullmann (17 June 1907, Berlin – 25 January 1985, Chertsey) was a German-British dance and movement teacher, predominantly remembered for her work in association with dance pioneer Rudolf Laban.

== Life ==
Lisa Ullmann was born in Berlin in 1907. She was intending to be a painter but at the suggestion of her father she studied Central European Modern Dance at the Laban School in Berlin which was run by Hertha Feist. There she joined the movement choir and heard Rudolf Laban talk, graduating in 1929.

== Work ==
Ullmann taught in Nuremberg and at the Essen Folkwang School, where she worked for Kurt Jooss. She left Nazi Germany in 1933 and went to Dartington, England with Jooss and his company, on the invitation of Leonard and Dorothy Elmhirst. In 1935, influenced by Laban's inclusive concept of "Dance for All", she established the first movement Choir in the country in Plymouth under the auspices of the Workers' Educational Association.

She taught at Dartington Hall until 1940, lectured regularly and choreographed extensively. Rudolf Laban also left for Britain, and, for twenty years (1938–58), Ullmann was his long-term partner and the main collaborator in his dance work.

Ullmann cofounded the Laban Art of Movement Guild in 1945, now known as the Laban Guild for Movement and Dance. In 1946, she also cofounded the Art of Movement Studio in Manchester, which became the centre for educational dance in England, training generations of modern dance teachers. In 1953, backed by the Ministry of Education, she became Principal of the new Art of Movement Studio in Addlestone, Surrey.

== Modern Educational Dance ==
In 1941 at a landmark Symposium attended by Her Majesty's Inspectorate, Laban and Ullmann presented a lecture-demonstration illustrating the concepts of dance education and its potential as a subject in the State Education System. The Board of Education set down a directive that one class per week of 'Modern Educational Dance' was to become a requirement of the curriculum.

This was the pivotal moment that established the place of dance education in schools for the future. The curriculum was based on Laban's space harmonies and his theories of the exploration of expressive movement through effort patterns. It was a phenomenological approach to learning: on praxis – the interweaving of theory and practice, on the challenge of creative action to develop confidence and problem-solving abilities, and the belief that dance is a powerful medium which enhances the lives of children.

She was also responsible for translating, revising and annotating several books written by Laban and for cataloguing, with Ellinor Hinks, the Laban Archives. She was still teaching up until the year of her death, imparting her expert knowledge of Laban's theories in courses run by LInC (Laban International Courses).

The Lisa Ullmann Travelling Scholarship Fund (Registered Charity No: 297684) was set up in 1987. The Fund has a unique policy to award travel scholarships to individual dance and movement practitioners wishing to pursue Continuing Professional Development Courses at destinations across the world. Over the past three decades, the Fund has awarded over 500 scholarships.

== See also ==
- Trinity Laban Conservatoire of Music and Dance
- Rudolf von Laban
- Space Harmony
