= Heike Hennig =

German choreographer and dancer

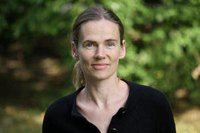
Heike Hennig (2008)

Heike Hennig (born 8 November 1966) is a German dancer, choreographer and director of the opera and dance ensemble "Heike Hennig & Co".

== Life ==
Heike Hennig had her first dance lessons at the age of 5 years in Leipzig of East Germany, studied modern dance, choreography and Body-Mind Centering (BMC) in Cologne and at Moving on Center – School for Participatory Arts and Research in Oakland in US with teachers such as Steve Paxton, worked in Brazil and Portugal.

In 1995, she returned to Germany. From 1998 onwards, worked as a freelance choreographer and teacher. She instructed body- and moving-oriented teaching-methods at the Palucca School of Dance, the University of Leipzig and the Academy of Visual Arts in Leipzig as well as in interdisciplinary workshops including anatomy, painting and choreography.

In 2000, Heike Hennig founded the FZTM (Forum of Contemporary Dance and Music) in Leipzig, together with Friedrich U. Minkus, and her ensemble Heike Hennig & Co. As director she developed numerous stage pieces and interdisciplinary art projects at many different stages and art institutions in Leipzig, Berlin, Dresden and Weimar, among other places. Her team consists of more than 50 artists working in different genres from architects to video artists.

At the Leipzig opera, Heike Hennig developed the dance piece Zeit – tanzen seit 1927 (Time – dancing since 1927) in 2005. This autobiographical dance theater was produced in 2007 as the documentary Tanz mit der Zeit Dancing with Time by the film director Trevor Peters from New Zealand. The film was co-produced with the national German TV-channel ZDF and the French-German TV-channel ARTE. In 2008, the piece was shown in German movie theaters, on TV and in international festivals. Heike Hennig arranged for the former dancers of the Leipzig opera to return on stage. Ursula Cain, Christa Franze, Siegfried Prölß und Horst Dittmann, who at this time were about 80 years old, told and danced their dance and life stories which were shaped by Mary Wigman, Dore Hoyer, Gret Palucca and Heike Hennig. During the shooting, the next dance piece Zeitsprünge (Leaps in Time) was created. here, the protagonists meet up with their younger colleagues in the ensemble Heike Hennig & Co and DJ cfm. The different generations might be recognized from the various dance-styles from Expressionist dance via Street dance and Contact improvisation to classical Ballet. In spring 2008, "Dancing with Time" came out as DVD and a book by the author Marion Appelt with a preface by Renate Schmidt.

For the 2007/08 season, Heike Hennig developed the cross-genre series oper unplugged (Opera unplugged) with music, dance, theater and new media at the Leipzig opera. At the season 2008/09 the cooperation with the baroque ensemble Lautten Compagney Berlin started. This hybridity of cross-genres, which results in the Tanzoper (dance opera) Rituale (Rituals) for George Frideric Handel at the Leipzig opera and the production Timeless at the Neues Museum of the Museum Island Berlin revealed new dimensions for the European contemporary opera. The highlight in 2010 was “Maria” by Heike Hennig, a dance oratorio for three singers, seven dancers, twelve musicians and one DJ on the stage. All artists are part of the choreography with music by George Frideric Handel, Alessandro Scarlatti and electronic music by cfm.

Heike Hennig & Co went on tour through Europe with her cross-genre pieces. They gave guest-performances at Deutsches Schauspielhaus Hamburg, Deutsches Nationaltheater Weimar, Staatsschauspiel Dresden and at theater houses in Athen, Nanjing, Travnik, Goethe-Institut Rom, Copenhagen, Vadstena, Mantua and other cities.

On juries and artistic advisory councils, Heike Hennig makes efforts to support contemporary performing art and music. In 2009, Heike Hennig was invited to teach at the University of British Columbia in Vancouver and Kelowna as well as at Simon Fraser University in Burnaby, Canada as a "Guest Speaker" via film, workshop and lectures. Since 2010, Heike Hennig has taught at the Zurich University of the Arts (ZHdK).

== Literature / DVD ==
- Marion Appelt: Tanz mit der Zeit (Dancing with Time), Leipzig, Plöttner Verlag 2008, ISBN 978-3-938442-45-6
- Trevor Peters: Tanz mit der Zeit (Dancing with Time), Berlin, Good Movies/Ventura 2009, Indigo, DVD 926328
- Sebastian Göschel über "Estha" in: Arbeit und Rhythmus, München, Wilhelm Fink 2009, ISBN 978-3-7705-4766-1
