= Whitgift Foundation =

British charity

The Whitgift Foundation
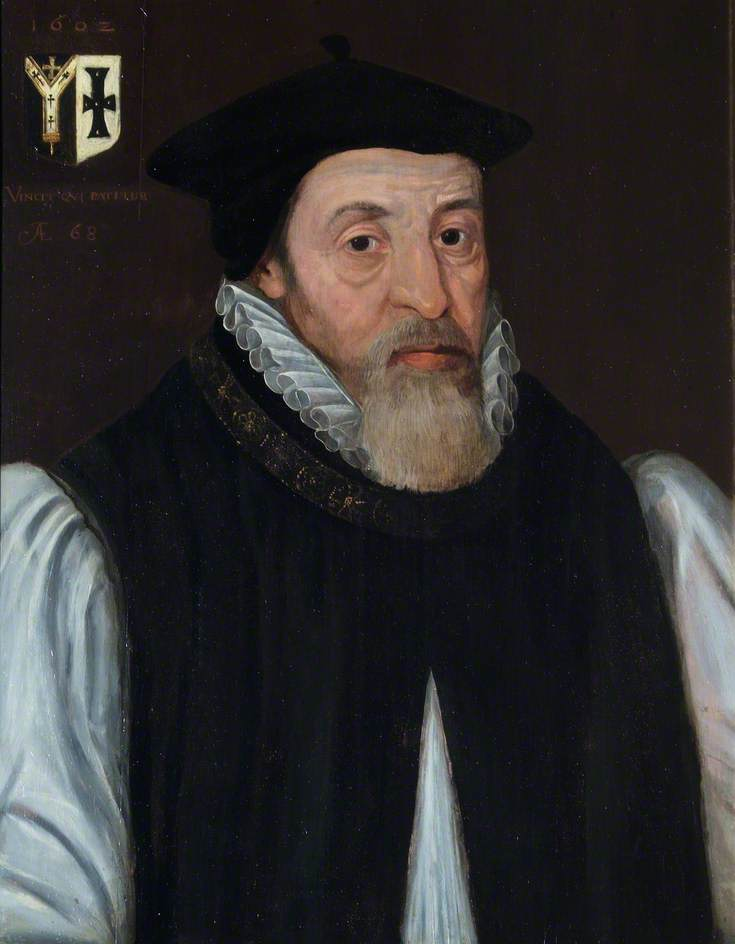
- Founded: 1596; 430 years ago
- Founder: John Whitgift (above)
- Type: Charitable trust
- Purpose: Education and Care
- Location: North End, Croydon, England
- Website: johnwhitgiftfoundation.org

The Whitgift Foundation is a charity based in Croydon, south London, England. The purpose of the charity is to provide education for the young and care for the elderly.

The main activities of the charity are the operation of two independent schools; providing sheltered accommodation; and nursing care through three care homes and running the Carer's Information Service. In addition, the charity provides bursaries and scholarships in excess of £5m a year.

The foundation is governed by a Court of Governors, including the Bishop of Croydon; the Vicar of Croydon; and nominees of the Archbishop of Canterbury and Croydon Council.

== History ==
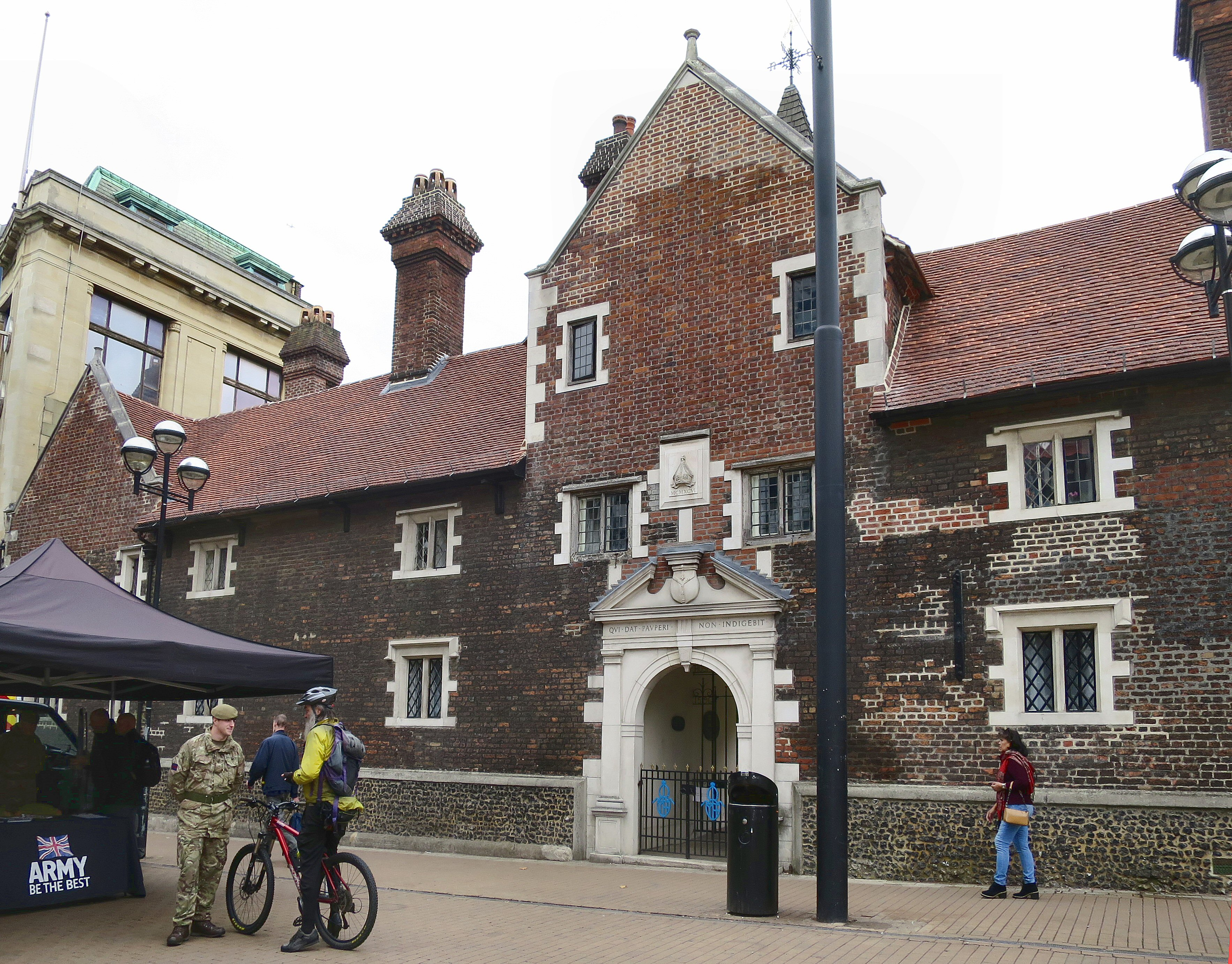
The Hospital of Holy Trinity almshouse in central Croydon

The Whitgift Foundation was founded in 1596 by the Archbishop of Canterbury, John Whitgift. His aims were to provide care for the elderly and education for the young.

Originally three separate buildings were built, The Hospital of Holy Trinity (now known as The Almshouses), The School House and Schoolmaster's House. The latter two were demolished in 1897, leaving the Almshouses as the only remaining original building. The Whitgift Centre, a large shopping mall, now stands where the later Victorian school and surrounding buildings and sports fields were. These buildings were occupied in turn by Whitgift School, prior to its move to south Croydon in 1931, and then by Trinity School, prior to its move to Shirley Park in 1965.

== Schools ==
The Whitgift Foundation runs two independent schools in Croydon:

- Whitgift School, for boys aged 10–19 years, with limited boarding.
- Trinity School of John Whitgift, for boys aged 10–19 years, with a co-educational sixth form

The Foundation also ran Old Palace School for girls (founded 1889) from 1993 until its closure in 2025.

John Whitgift Academy in Grimsby in Lincolnshire is named after John Whitgift, who was born in the town, but is not part of the Whitgift Foundation.
