= Lilian Harmel =

Lilian Harmel (May 5, 1908 – August 9, 1982) was an Austrian dancer, choreographer and pedagogue.

== Life and career ==
Lilian Harmel was born in England on May 5, 1908. Her childhood was spent in Alexandria, Egypt, where she first began to dance. She was trained in classical ballet (in the Preobrajenska method) in Vienna. In Vienna, she subsequently became a pupil of Gertrud Bodenwieser at the State Academy. She later studied choreography from Kurt Jooss and, in the style of German Expressionism, under Mary Wigman. By the beginning of the 1930s, she had performed to critical acclaim in the major artistic centres of continental Europe. She wrote choreographic compositions for a soloist to works by Scriabin, Prokofiev, Karl Orff, Hindemith, Bartók, and Mompou. The Wiener Zeitung described her as an "artist of genius and soul"; the Neues Wiener Tagblatt as "a very remarkable talent" with "perfect technical mastery"; and the Neues Wiener Journal stated that she possessed "perfect domination in the art of movement". In her twenties, she received critical acclaim on the continent, including Paris, Florence, Rome, Milan, Turin, Budapest, Nice, Warsaw, Bratislava, Amsterdam, Venice, Prague, Saltzburg, Geneva and Zurich. The Nuovo Gionale wrote of "this refined and elegant dancer", while Il Giornale d'Italia stated: "Lilian Harmel is a true artist, who expresses with her perfect technique the pictures of her fantasy, the sentiments of her soul and the spirit of ballet." La Nazione wrote: "the technique of this dancer is perfect, there is true precision of form, absolute ability of means, sureness in balance, the gifts of musicality and a complete power of expression." She moved to Paris in 1936, where she was filmed for an early French television broadcast. She subsequently moved to England with her fiancé in 1938. On her arrival in England, The Daily Telegraph wrote "she has a very personable appearance and possesses imagination and intelligence... she is both interesting and striking", while the Daily Mail described her as "an original and gifted exponent of pure dancing both in technique and interpretation", and The Sketch welcomed her as "a brilliant young dancer".

After the war, she opened a dance studio inside her house in Hampstead. By 1957, her classes had over 25 young children and 25 teenage and adult students. She had originally intended to teach children temporarily, but was persuaded to continue after Hampstead parents had told her "they think it is most necessary in Hampstead." Many Moons, her children's ballet, was performed on ITV on Christmas Day 1967. Harmel was an early pioneer in the setting of electronic and contemporary music to dance, choreographing performances to Edgard Varèse, Karlheinz Stockhausen, Pierre Boulez, and Cesar Bresgen. In her teaching, she came to conceive of dance as a process of personal discovery, rather than mere performance. To this end, in the tradition of the Tanztheater, her Hampstead classes accepted students of all abilities, both amateurs and professionals, so long as they shared her passion for individual development. To celebrate her forty years of teaching, in 1978, at the age of 70, she performed a final solo dance at the Hampstead Theatre.

On her death, The Times wrote: "she enriched generations of children and dance students through her concern for the artistic development of the individual... she and her work were a beacon".

Friends and collaborators included Rudolf Laban, Cesar Bresgen, Marie-Louise von Motesiczky, Mary Wigman, Charles Philips Trevelyan, Georges-Emmanuel Clancier, Felix Albrecht Harta, Adrian Stokes, Hilde Holger.

== See also ==
- Contemporary dance
- Expressionism
- Mary Wigman
- Rudolf Laban
- Tanztheater
- Ausdruckstanz
