= Suzanne Perrottet =

Swiss expressionist dancer and musician (1889–1983)

- Born: 13 September 1899; Rolle, Vaud; Switzerland
- Died: 10 August 1983 (aged 93); Zürich, Zürich, Switzerland
- Known for: expressionist dance, Dada

Suzanne Perrottet (French pronunciation: [syzan pɛʁɔtɛ]; 13 September 1889 – 10 August 1983) was a Swiss dancer, musician, and movement teacher. Trained in music and dance, Perrottet ran the Bewegungsschule Suzanne Perrottet and was a member of the faculty at the École Polytechnique Fédérale de Lausanne and the Zürcher Bühnenstudio. She was active in the Dada art movement as a musician, performing at the Kaufleuten. In 1939 she co-founded the Swiss Professional Association of Dance and Movement. Along with Mary Wigman and Rudolf von Laban, she is considered one of the co-founders of modern Expressionist dance.

== Biography ==
Suzanne Perrottet was born on 13 September 1889 in Rolle, Switzerland. Her father, Emile Jules, was a pharmacist. Her mother was Adèle Julie Amélie Simon. She trained as a violinist at the Conservatoire de Musique de Genève, graduating in 1909. In 1910 worked as a teacher of music and rhythm at Émile Jaques-Dalcroze's school in Hellerau.

In 1912, she moved to Vienna to teach Dalcroze eurhythmics. She was an active member in the Dada movement and performed musical works in Zürich. In 1913 she trained in dance with Rudolf von Laban at Monte Verità. In 1918 she took over the management of the Laban School, later renaming it the Bewegungsschule Suzanne Perrottet. She ran the school and taught there until 1979. With von Laban and Mary Wigman she is considered one of the founders of modern Expressionist dance.

In 1936, she was hired to teach rhythmic gymnastics, body language, and musical accompaniment at the École Polytechnique Fédérale de Lausanne. She also taught pantomime, gymnastics, and dance at the Zürcher Bühnenstudio. In 1939 she became a co-founder of the Swiss Professional Association of Dance and Movement, serving on the committee until 1955.

== Death ==
Perrottet died on 10 August 1983 in Zürich at the age of 93. Her estate, including photographs, documents, and letters, was donated to the Kunsthaus Zurich in 1990.
