= Ursula Cain =

German dancer and dance teacher

Ursula Cain (April 24, 1927 in Dresden – October 16, 2011 in Leipzig) was a German dancer and dance teacher.

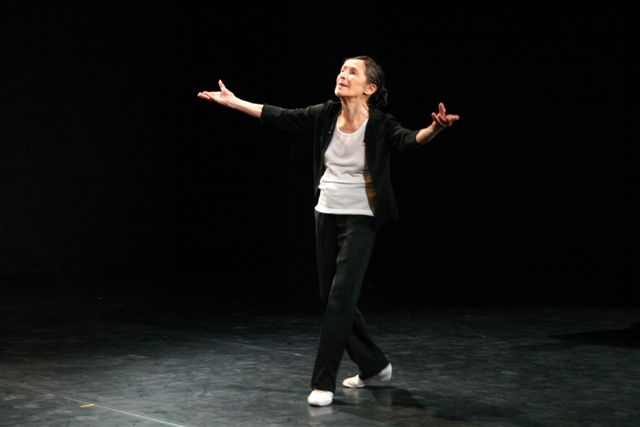
Ursula Cain in "Dancing with Time" Choreography by Heike Hennig (2006) Postermotiv

== Biography ==
The dancer and the dance teacher Ursula Cain began her dance education at the age of 12 years in the preparatory class of the Mary Wigman Schule for modern dance. She studied from 1942 until the close-down because of the Second World War at the Dance-Academy of the Conservatoire of the state capital Dresden. After her graduation and status as stage-dancer and dance-teacher Ursula Cain became a member of the Dore Hoyer-group in 1945. She danced until the closing of the group in Tänze für Käthe Kollwitz (Dances for Käthe Kollwitz), Lied der Zeit (Song of time) and Schießbude (Shooting Gallery). From 1948, Cain danced at the Volkstheater Rostock and from 1949 at the Anhaltisches Theater Dessau as modern principal dancer. There she dances soloist-roles in choreographies by Veith Büchel and gets to know the former conductor of orchestra and first music director of the Oper Leipzig, Helmut Seydelmann. From 1951, Cain started her studies of classical ballet with Gertrud Steinweg in Leipzig and Tatjana Gsovsky and also with Gustav Blank in Berlin. She was engaged in 1952 at the Städtisches Theater Leipzig as principal dancer and from 1953 on as first soloist artist. She danced in numerous choreographies from Gertrud Steinweg, Lilo Gruber, Werner Ulbrich, Tom Schilling and Emmy Köhler-Richter. In October 1960, Ursula Cain danced in the festive program for the opening of the new Operahouse in Leipzig, which was broadcast on TV on the channel Deutscher Fernsehfunk of the former GDR. Ursula Cain danced the Wicked Fairy in Sleeping Beauty in the choreography by Emmy Köhler-Richter. Terminating her active career on stage she danced the role Archisposa in Apraxas in 1962. From 1979, Ursula Cain worked as dance teacher for modern dance at the specialized college for dance "Ballet-School of the Oper Leipzig" ("Ballettschule der Oper Leipzig") tätig. She overtook the responsibility for the children-classes at the "Ballet-School of the Oper Leipzig" in 1988. In 1989, Ursula Cain became the leader of the amateur group „Tanzkaleidoskop“ in the "house of Heinrich Budde" ("Heinrich Budde Haus") in Leipzig. In 1997, she developed the choreography for the children-classes for the annual Matinée of the "Ballet-School of the Oper Leipzig".

== Second stage career ==
In 2005, Ursula Cain and her dance colleagues Christa Franze, Siegfried Prölß and Horst Dittmann of the Oper Leipzig, conducted by the German choreographer Heike Hennig and Friedrich U. Minkus from Leipzig, began to work on the autobiographical dance-theater Time – dancing since 1927. The project celebrated in 2006 its extraordinary success at the Oper Leipzig. Time - dancing since 1927 was produced as documentary Dancing with Time by Trevor Peters for ZDF and ARTE, was shown at German cinemas in 2007/8 and international Festivals. In 2008, the author Marion Appelt published the book Dancing with Time, adding interviews and photos of the four aged dancers. From 2007 on, Ursula Cain continued her second stage-career in the contemporary dance-theater Leaps in Time (ZeitSprünge) by Heike Hennig with the extraordinary and unique ensemble Heike Hennig & Co with more than 30 performances and guest performances at international festivals. Her Pas de deux with Horst Dittmann to the slow movement from the 5th symphony of Gustav Mahler, which is seen in the documentary film, too, is one of the highlights in the dance-theater of generations staged by Heike Hennig. In 2008 Ursula Cain danced the Alcina by George Frideric Handel with Horst Dittmann as Ruggiero directed and choreographed by Heike Hennig at the Handel Festival, Halle. Ursula Cain is known as oldest stage-active students of Mary Wigman.

== Honours ==
In 1993, for the 300-year anniversary of the Oper Leipzig, Ursula Cain got honorary member of the Oper Leipzig.

The former artist director Udo Zimmermann congratulated the "dream-ballerina" ("Traum-Ballerina") to her 60th birthday: Maybe it was due to this combination of Wigman and Gsovsky, connected to the place Leipzig, where those two important figures worked together, which realized the lucky chance, that you became the embodiment of the classical lyrical ballerina. In any case, it could have only been you, because you have been one of the few ones, who had everything about in, in that time.– Oper Leipzig

In March 2008 the international dance-magazine "Ballettanz" named Ursula Cain as Grande dame of the dance in Leipzig.

The President of the Federal Republic of Germany Horst Köhler honoured Ursula Cain by inviting her in the Federal Presidency Office in the Bellevue Palace (Schloss Bellevue) in Berlin on 27 March 2008.

== Literature / DVD ==
- Marion Appelt: Tanz mit der Zeit (Dancing with Time), Leipzig, Plöttner Verlag 2008, ISBN 978-3-938442-45-6
- Trevor Peters: Tanz mit der Zeit (Dancing with Time), Berlin, Good Movies/Ventura 2009, Indigo, DVD 926328
