= Dancing with Time =

- Directed by: Trevor Peters
- Written by: Trevor Peters and Mark Michel (screenplay); Heike Hennig (story and choreography)
- Starring: Heike Hennig; Ursula Cain; Christa Franze; Siegfried Prölß; Horst Dittmann
- Release date: 2007
- Running time: 103 minutes
- Language: German (subtitled)

Dancing with Time (Tanz mit der Zeit) is a film by Trevor Peters about the autobiography Dance Theater Zeit – tanzen seit 1927 by Heike Hennig.

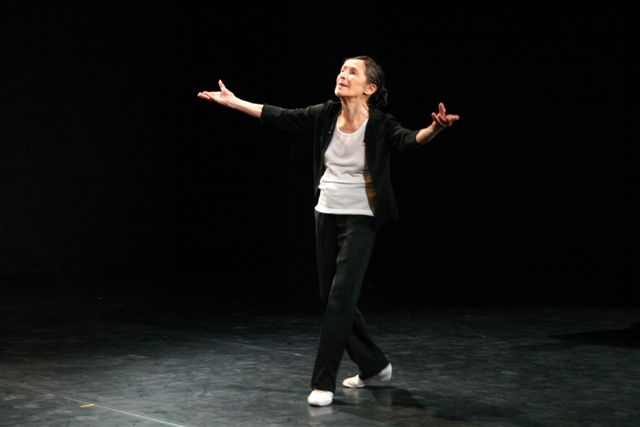
Ursula Cain in "Zeit tanzen seit 1927" von Heike Hennig (2006) Postermotiv

== Plot ==
Four dancers, nearing their eighties, take up the challenge of Heike Hennig to return to the stage in Leipzig's opera house. Ursula Cain, Christa Franze, Siegfried Prölß and Horst Dittmann have been leading members of the Ballet of the Oper Leipzig. A performance of emotional richness combined with the stories of their lives, from Mary Wigman, Gret Palucca to Heike Hennig. Nothing about them is old, except their age.

Dancing with Time was produced as film for TV (f.ex.: ARTE and ZDF) and movie-theaters, as DVD and as book by Marion Appelt, with a preface of Renate Schmidt.

== Music ==
- Jureks Zeit: (J. Lamorski)
- Kalumbo: (C. Meyer/R. Moser)
- Something in the Park: (C. Meyer/R. Moser)
- Give me that old Time Religion: (trad.arr. Moses Hogan) Darek Lee Ragin & The New World Ensemble-Chamber Choir
- Brandenburgische Konzerte: G-dur, Allegro (J. S. Bach)
- Symphony No. 5: C-Sharp minor, Adagietto (G. Mahler) Berliner Philharmoniker - Claudio Abbado
- Dancing with Memories: (C. Meyer)
- Ich sitze gerade Zuhause und werde mir eine Zigarette drehen: Ammer & Console)
- Django Theme: (M. Dietrich/J. Simon/VM De Luxe/O. F. Berdomo) DJ Opossum

== Development ==
Dancing with Time is produced from ma.ja.de filmproduktion in co-produktion with ZDF in collaboration with ARTE, (subtitled) North American Premiere on VIFF in Vancouver 2008
