= John Whitgift Academy =

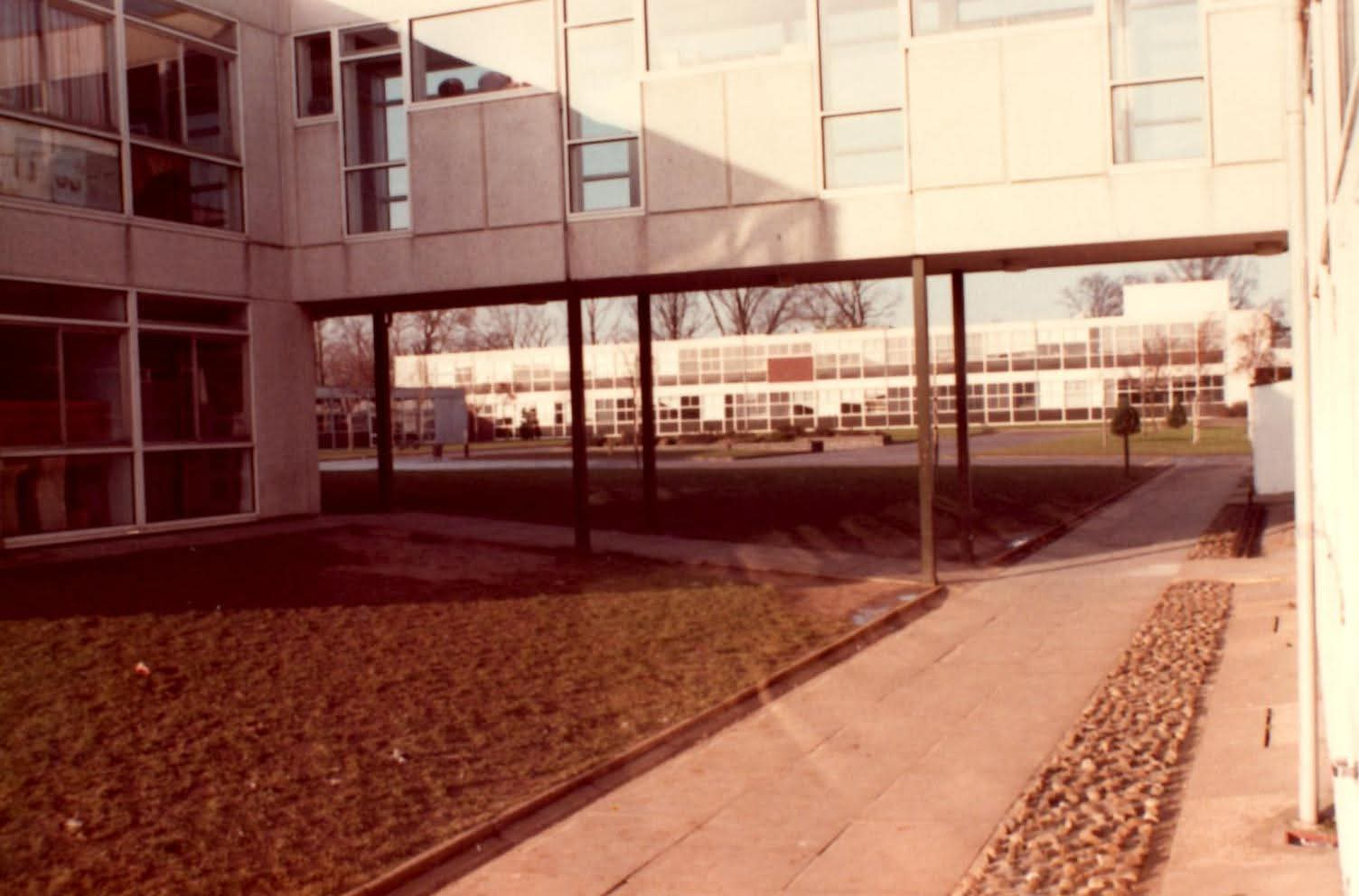

Location
- Crosland Road; Great Coates; Grimsby, Lincolnshire, DN37 9EH; England; 53°34′17″N 0°07′56″W

Information
- Type: Academy
- Motto: Changing Lives
- Established: October 1970
- Local authority: North East Lincolnshire
- Department for Education URN: 137464 Tables
- Ofsted: Reports
- Chair of Governors: Gail Young
- Principal: Robert Spendlow
- Staff: 95
- Gender: Coeducational
- Age: 11 to 16
- Enrolment: 945
- Website: https://johnwhitgift.org.uk/

John Whitgift Academy (formerly known as Whitgift School) is a co-educational secondary school with academy status in Grimsby, North East Lincolnshire, England. The academy is a part of Delta Academies Trust.

== Admissions ==
The school became John Whitgift Academy in September 2011. There are around 945 pupils. It serves the areas of Great Coates, The Willows and Wybers Wood, although it has an intake from across Grimsby now that it has its own transport. The school has been described as "based in a large area of a former council estate... Families moving into that area have Whitgift school at the heart of their community, which is also an area with some deprivation".

== History ==
It is named after John Whitgift, a native of Grimsby and Archbishop of Canterbury from 1583 to 1604. Crosland Road, where the school was built, was named after Anthony Crosland the former (pre-1977) MP for Great Grimsby. Crosland implemented Comprehensive Education across the UK, specifically removing most grammar schools. Until April 1974 the school was administered by the County Borough of Grimsby Education Committee, then Humberside Education Committee in Beverley. The school became known as Whitgift Comprehensive School.

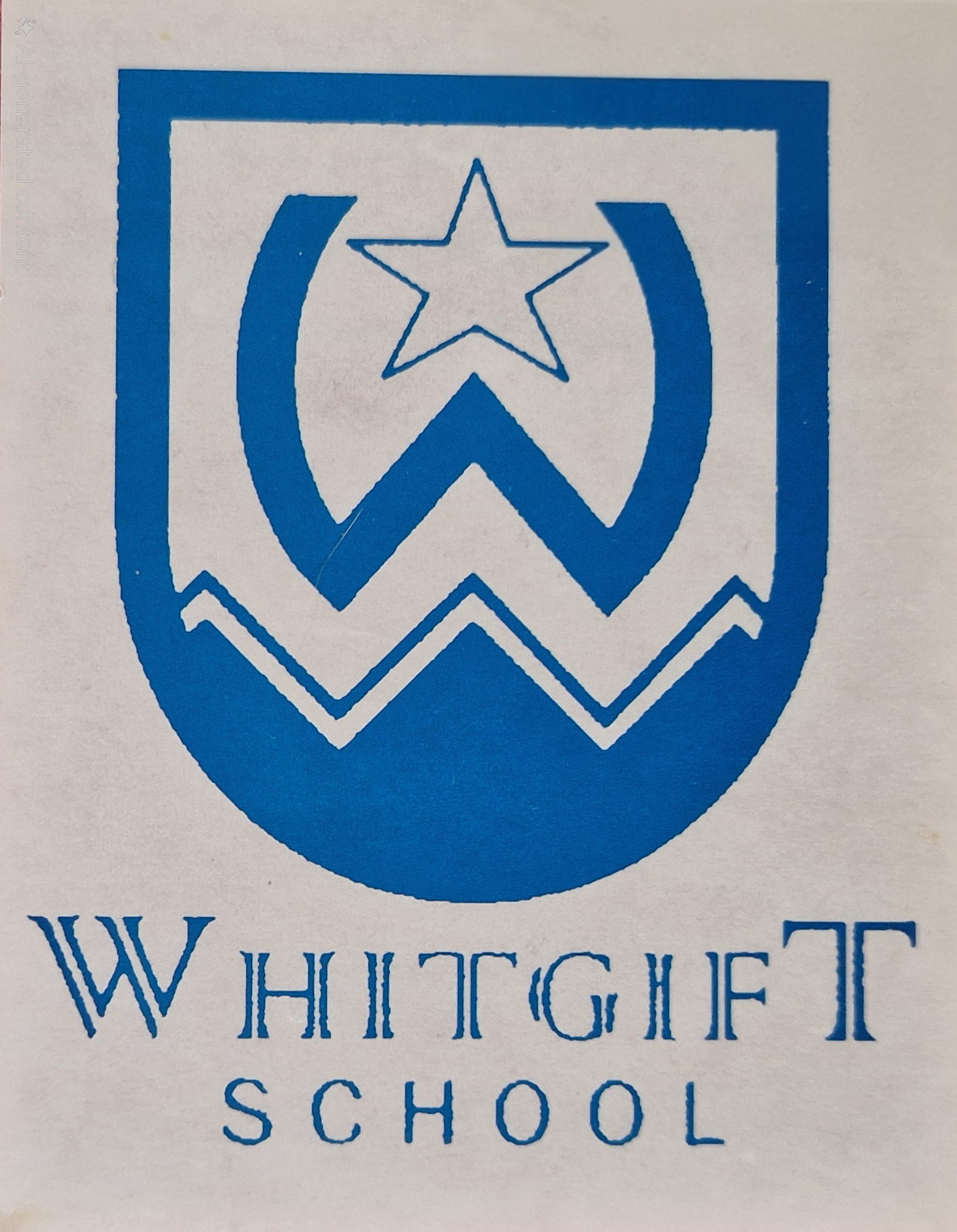
Logo of the school

=== Former technical school ===
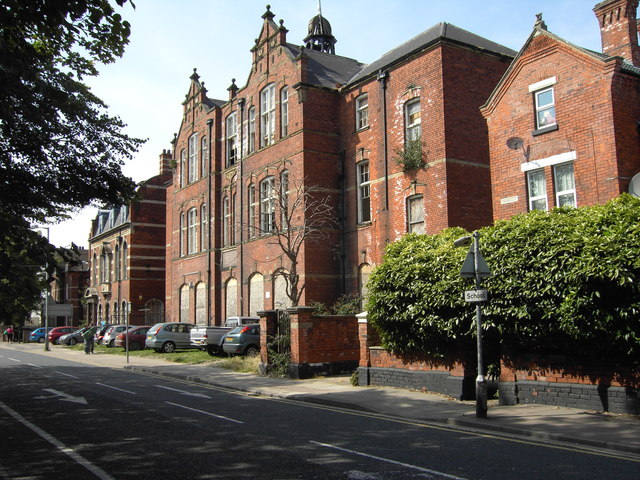
Eleanor Street former site

In 1954 a new site of 14 acres was looked at for the Grimsby Technical Secondary School, but none could be found. The technical school had a sixth form.

The technical school offered the same curriculum as the former John Leggott Grammar School in Scunthorpe, a grammar-technical school.

The former technical school buildings on Eleanor Street would become the Heneage School until 1982, when this became part of the Havelock School, and later Grimsby School of Art from 1983, when it moved from Nuns Corner, until around 1995.

=== Construction ===
In 1969 the school was to be called the Willows Secondary School. At a Grimsby Education Committee meeting in November 1969, it was voted by 10-6 to call the school the Whitgift School.

It was to be built on the Willows Estate at Great Coates, to open in September 1970. It would open as a selective school, along with Wintringham, Havelock and Hereford schools. An eleven plus test would be taken before entering the school.

(Photos of construction and shots of the reel are currently being recovered)

=== Opening ===
The school opened in September 1970 in the former technical school for a half term. It moved into the new school in Great Coates in late October 1970. The new school had the same teaching staff as the former technical school.

The school's O-level and A-level courses would be taught on the former site of the technical school on Eleanor Street, until the Great Coates school had more buildings.

A fire damaged part of the school on Friday 30 July 1971.

=== Comprehensive school ===
It would become a full comprehensive school in September 1974.

=== 1984 M1 minibus incident ===
On the evening of Saturday 30 June 1984, when returning from the Lords cricket ground with 25 boys, the school Sherpa minibus hit a broken down Chrysler Alpine on the M1 near Long Buckby. The Alpine driver was Ishmail Kapadia, a 24 year old student, of Tinton Road in Perry Barr, driving back from Colchester. A second school minibus followed the first, driven by head of the religious education, Stephen Owen. The crash happened before a contraflow system. The first minibus was driven by a PE teacher, 26 year old Malcolm Jackson, of Clixby Close in Cleethorpes.

The 14 year old third-year Andrew Thomas of 30 Tyler Avenue, Grimsby, was killed, when thrown from the minibus. Five boys were injured. The injured boys were taken to the Hospital of St Cross, Rugby. 13 year old Peter Francis of Morton Road had chest injuries, 14 year old Andrew Mullins of Larmour Road had arm and wrist injuries, and a 13 year old of St Nicholas Drive had an injured shoulder.

Andrew was buried on Friday 6 July, with a service at St Hugh's church. He was the opening batsman for the school team.

=== Specialist sports college ===
It became a specialist sports college in 2006.

=== Fires ===
The school has had a large number of fires from 1971 to 2017, including fires in 1995 and 1997 which caused major damage.

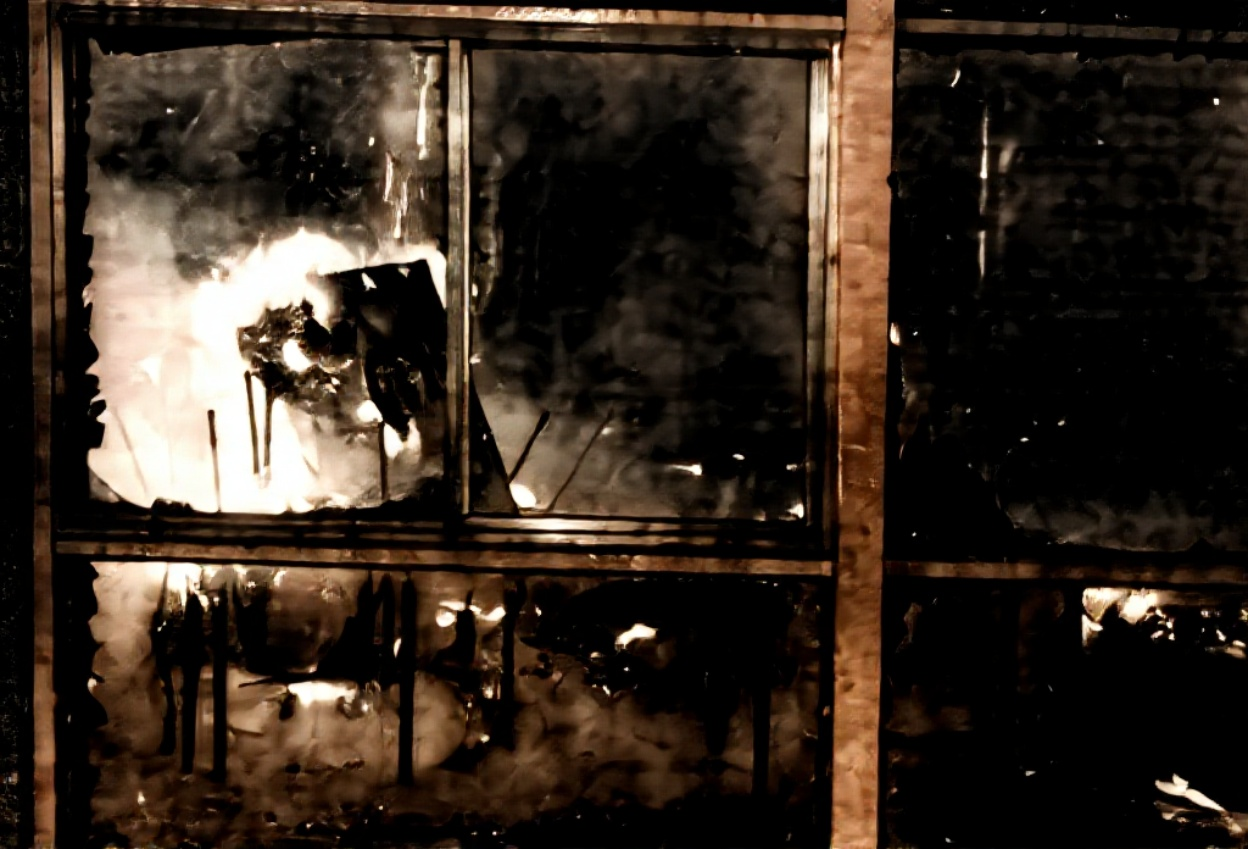
Colour photo of the fire

To many the fire that happened a week after opening in 1971 was displayed as a bad omen for the school, but unlike most it is said this is the only fire that happened in school hours and displayed a threat, "a week after opening in 1971 the newly constructed Whitgift School was met with a blaze destroying the internal section of the new building during school hours". There was another fire in 2001 which apparently happened in the North Block and a science room due to either a electrical fault or combustion from a leak and the fire in 2017 was caused by a student setting fire to toilet roll in west block which at the time was a dance studio

== Headteachers ==
- 1970 Mr W. G. Baines
- 1980s David Thacker
- 1990s Mrs Ireland
- 1990s Mr Smith
- Approx 2000s Mark Rushby
- ? Dr Shella Kay (may be spelt incorrectly, referenced as headmistress in 2000s on BBC due to a knifepen copy cat attack)
- 2010s Mr Spendlow
- 2026 Dr S Stokes

== Whitgift Film Theatre ==
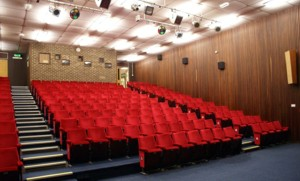
The 203-seat theatre at Whitgift School. The theatre is used for educational purposes within the school, such as assemblies, as well as the showing of films.

In July 1970, Grimsby Education Committee gave £10,000 towards the establishment of a regional film theatre.

The school has the 203-seat Whitgift Film Theatre. This is the only school in the UK with such a building, and was built as part of the school when the British Film Institute wanted a network of regional film theatres.

The cinema building opened, only as a theatre, in late April 1972. The civic opening was Thursday 28 September 1972, showing Gumshoe, around the same time that Doncaster Film Theatre opened. There were 45 BFI-funded regional film theatres in the UK at that point. It became known as Grimsby Film Theatre.

From 1992 to 2000, it was known as Grimsby Screen. The cinema was bought from (former) Grimsby council when it was going to be closed by a group of amateurs who also had in their possession a large film library. The commercial operation briefly closed in April 2005 due to competition from the nine-screen Parkway Cinema in Cleethorpes which opened in November 2004 but the group of amateurs stepped in two weeks later. It used to be Grimsby's only cinema, until the Odeon was re-opened as The Regal on Freeman Street.

== Academic performance ==
In 2018/19 2019/20, 2020/2021 and 2021/2022, the school's Progress 8 measure was Well Above Average and the highest performing academy in Grimsby. The proportion of pupils achieving Grade 5 or above in English & maths GCSEs was above the local authority average of 34%. The proportion of pupils entered for the English Baccalaureate was 53% compared to 37% in the local authority and 40% nationally.

The school's rate of exclusions in 2016/17 was very high, almost one in four children being excluded, the fifteenth-highest rate nationally, although well below national average in subsequent years.

Attendance in recent years is well above national average and the highest amongst all local secondaries.

== Inspection judgements ==
As of 2020, the school's most recent Ofsted judgement was Good.

The previous judgement, in 2017, was Requires Improvement.

== Alumni ==
- Helen Fospero, television presenter
- Ian Huntley (1985–90)

=== Grimsby Technical Secondary School ===
- Prof John Sizer (1938-2008), former chief executive of the Scottish Higher Education Funding Committee, and Professor of Business Management at Loughborough University

== See also ==
- List of schools in Yorkshire and the Humber
