= Laban movement analysis =

System for analyzing human movement

Laban movement analysis (LMA), sometimes Laban/Bartenieff movement analysis, is a method and language for describing, visualizing, interpreting and documenting human movement. It is based on the original work of Rudolf Laban, which was developed and extended by Lisa Ullmann, Irmgard Bartenieff, Warren Lamb and others. LMA draws from multiple fields including anatomy, kinesiology and psychology. It is used by dancers, actors, musicians and athletes; by health professionals such as physical and occupational therapists and psychotherapists; and in anthropology, business consulting and leadership development.

Labanotation (or Kinetography Laban), a notation system for recording and analyzing movement, is used in LMA, but Labanotation is a separate system.

== Categories of movement ==
Laban movement analysis is contemporarily categorised in various ways. Originally, these categories were very basic and Laban himself referred mostly to Eukinetics - which is his effort studies - and Choreutics - which is Spatial Harmony theory. His student Irmgard Bartenieff later further elaborated these categories in four - Body, Effort, Shape and Space - and this system, known as BESS is commonly taught today. However, BESS is not the only organisation of Laban's theory in use. In the U.K. for example, more influenced by Lisa Ullmann, another student of Laban, the categories are Body, Effort, Space and Relationship with Shape being interwoven into Body, Space and Relationship.

The categories of BESS are as follows:

- Body - what the body is doing and the interrelationships within the body
- Effort - the qualities of movement
- Shape - how the body is changing shape and what motivates it to do so
- Space - where the body is moving and the harmonic relationships in space

Other categories, that are occasionally mentioned in some literature, are relationship and phrasing. These are less well defined. Relationship is the interaction between people, body parts or a person and an object. Phrasing is defined as being the personal expression of a movement.

Example organisation of Laban movement analysis categories.

These categories are in turn occasionally divided into kinematic and non-kinematic categories to distinguish which categories relate to changes to body relations over time and space.

Organisation of Laban movement analysis categories into kinematic and non-kinematic groups.

=== Body ===
The body category describes structural and physical characteristics of the human body while moving. This category is responsible for describing which body parts are moving, which parts are connected, which parts are influenced by others, and general statements about body organization.

Several subcategories of body are:

- Initiation of movement starting from specific bodies;
- Connection of different bodies to each other;
- Sequencing of movement between parts of the body; and
- Patterns of body organization and connectivity, called "patterns of total body square connectivity", "developmental hyper movement patterns", or "neuromuscular shape-shifting patterns".

=== Effort ===
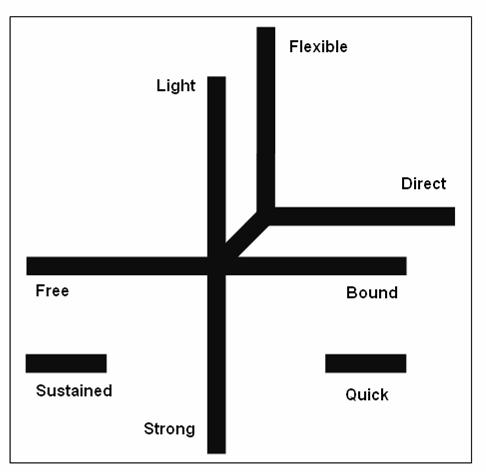
Laban effort graph with effort elements labeled

Effort, or what Laban sometimes described as dynamics, is a system for understanding the more subtle characteristics about movement with respect to inner intention. The difference between punching someone in anger and reaching for a glass is slight in terms of body organization – both rely on extension of the arm. The attention to the strength of the movement, the control of the movement and the timing of the movement are very different.

Effort has four subcategories (effort factors), each of which has two opposite polarities (Effort elements).

Effort Factor	Effort element (Fighting polarity)	Effort element (Indulging polarity)
Space	Direct	Indirect (flexible)
Weight	Strong	Light
Time	Sudden (quick)	Sustained
Flow	Bound	Free

Laban named the combination of the first three categories (Space, Weight, and Time) the Effort Actions, or Action Drive. The eight combinations are descriptively named Float, Punch (Thrust), Glide, Slash, Dab, Wring, Flick, and Press. The Action Efforts have been used extensively in some acting schools, including ALRA, Manchester School of Theatre, LIPA and London College of Music to train in the ability to change quickly between physical manifestations of emotion.

Flow, on the other hand, is responsible for the continuousness or ongoingness of motions. Without any Flow Effort, movement must be contained in a single initiation and action, which is why there are specific names for the Flow-less Action configurations of Effort. In general it is very difficult to remove Flow from much movement, and so a full analysis of Effort will typically need to go beyond the Effort Actions.

==== Combinations of Efforts ====
While the individual motion factors of Space, Time, Weight and Flow may be observed, usually they will appear in combinations. Combinations of 3 Motion Factors are known as drives. The drives are:

- The Action Drive - where Weight, Space and Time are present but Flow is missing
- The Passion Drive - where Weight, Time and Flow are present but Space is missing
- The Spell Drive - where Weight, Space and Flow are present but Time is missing
- The Vision Drive - where Space, Time and Flow are present but Weight is missing

Alongside the drives, combinations of two efforts are known as states. The states are known as:

- Awake - combining Space and Time
- Dreamlike - combining Weight and Flow
- Distant - combining Space and Flow
- Near/Rhythm - combining Time and Weight
- Stabile - combining Space and Weight
- Labile/Mobile - combining Time and Flow

Full effort, where all 4 motion factors are equally expressed, is usually considered to be a rare and usually momentary occurrence.

The states and drives are often discussed as having distinct psychological characteristics.

=== Shape ===
While the Body category primarily develops connections within the body and the body/space intent, the way the body changes shape during movement is further experienced and analyzed through the Shape category. It is important to remember that all categories are related, and Shape is often an integrating factor for combining the categories into meaningful movement.

There are several subcategories in Shape:

- "Shape Forms" describe static shapes that the body takes, such as Wall-like, Ball-like, and Pin-like.
- "Modes of Shape Change" describe the way the body is interacting with and the relationship the body has to the environment. There are three Modes of Shape Change:
  - Shape Flow: Representing a relationship of the body to itself. Essentially a stream of consciousness expressed through movement, this could be amoebic movement or could be mundane habitual actions, like shrugging, shivering, rubbing an injured shoulder, etc.
  - Directional: Representing a relationship where the body is directed toward some part of the environment. It is divided further into Spoke-like (punching, pointing, etc.) and Arc-like (swinging a tennis racket, painting a fence)
  - Carving: Representing a relationship where the body is actively and three dimensionally interacting with the volume of the environment. Examples include kneading bread dough, wringing out a towel, avoiding laser-beams or miming the shape of an imaginary object. In some cases, and historically, this is referred to as Shaping, though many practitioners feel that all three Modes of Shape Change are "shaping" in some way, and that the term is thus ambiguous and overloaded.
- "Shape Qualities" describe the way the body is changing (in an active way) toward some point in space. In the simplest form, this describes whether the body is currently Opening (growing larger with more extension) or Closing (growing smaller with more flexion). There are more specific terms – Rising, Sinking, Spreading, Enclosing, Advancing, and Retreating, which refer to specific dimensions of spatial orientations.
- "Shape Flow Support" describes the way the torso (primarily) can change in shape to support movements in the rest of the body. It is often referred to as something which is present or absent, though there are more refined descriptors.

=== Space ===
One of Laban's primary contributions to Laban Movement Analysis (LMA) are his theories of Space. This category involves motion in connection with the environment, and with spatial patterns, pathways, and lines of spatial tension. Laban described a complex system of geometry based on crystalline forms, Platonic solids, and the structure of the human body. He felt that there were ways of organizing and moving in space that were specifically harmonious, in the same sense as music can be harmonious. Some combinations and organizations were more theoretically and aesthetically pleasing. As with music, Space Harmony sometimes takes the form of set 'scales' of movement within geometric forms. These scales can be practiced in order to refine the range of movement and reveal individual movement preferences. The abstract and theoretical depth of this part of the system is often considered to be much greater than the rest of the system. In practical terms, there is much of the Space category that does not specifically contribute to the ideas of Space Harmony.

This category also describes and notates choices which refer specifically to space, paying attention to:

- Kinesphere: the area that the body is moving within and how the mover is paying attention to it. This can be defined both physically (ie- the distance the body can reach without taking a step) and psychologically (ie - the space the mover senses as theirs or effects).
- Spatial Intention: the directions or points in space that the mover is identifying or using.
- Geometrical observations of where the movement is being done, in terms of emphasis of directions, places in space, planar movement, etc.

The Space category is currently under continuing development, more so since exploration of non-Euclidean geometry and physics has evolved.

== Use in human–computer interaction ==
LMA is used in Human-Computer Interaction as a means of extracting useful features from a human's movement to be understood by a computer, as well as generating realistic movement animation for virtual agents and robots.

== Formal study ==
Laban movement analysis practitioners and educators who studied at LIMS, an accredited institutional member of the National Association of Schools of Dance (NASD), are known as "Certified Movement Analysts" (CMAs).

Laban/Bartenieff and Somatic Studies International™ (LSSI), is an approved training program of ISMETA, and offers Movement Analysis and Somatic Practice training, which qualifies “Certified Movement Analysts & Somatic Practitioners” (CMA-SPs).

Other courses offer LMA studies, including Integrated Movement Studies, which qualifies "Certified Laban/Bartenieff Movement Analysts" (CLMAs).

The Laban Guild, set up by Rudolf Laban in the UK, offers courses in Laban Movement Analysis and Labannotation and is responsible for preserving and developing the work in the U.K.

Trinity Laban Conservatoire of Music and Dance offer a 3-year post-graduate diploma in Choreological studies and Valerie Preston-Dunlop is a course director.

== See also ==
- Benesh Movement Notation
- Choreography
- Dance notation
- Dance Notation Bureau
- Laban notation symbols
- Motif description
