= Contemporary dance =

Genre of dance performance

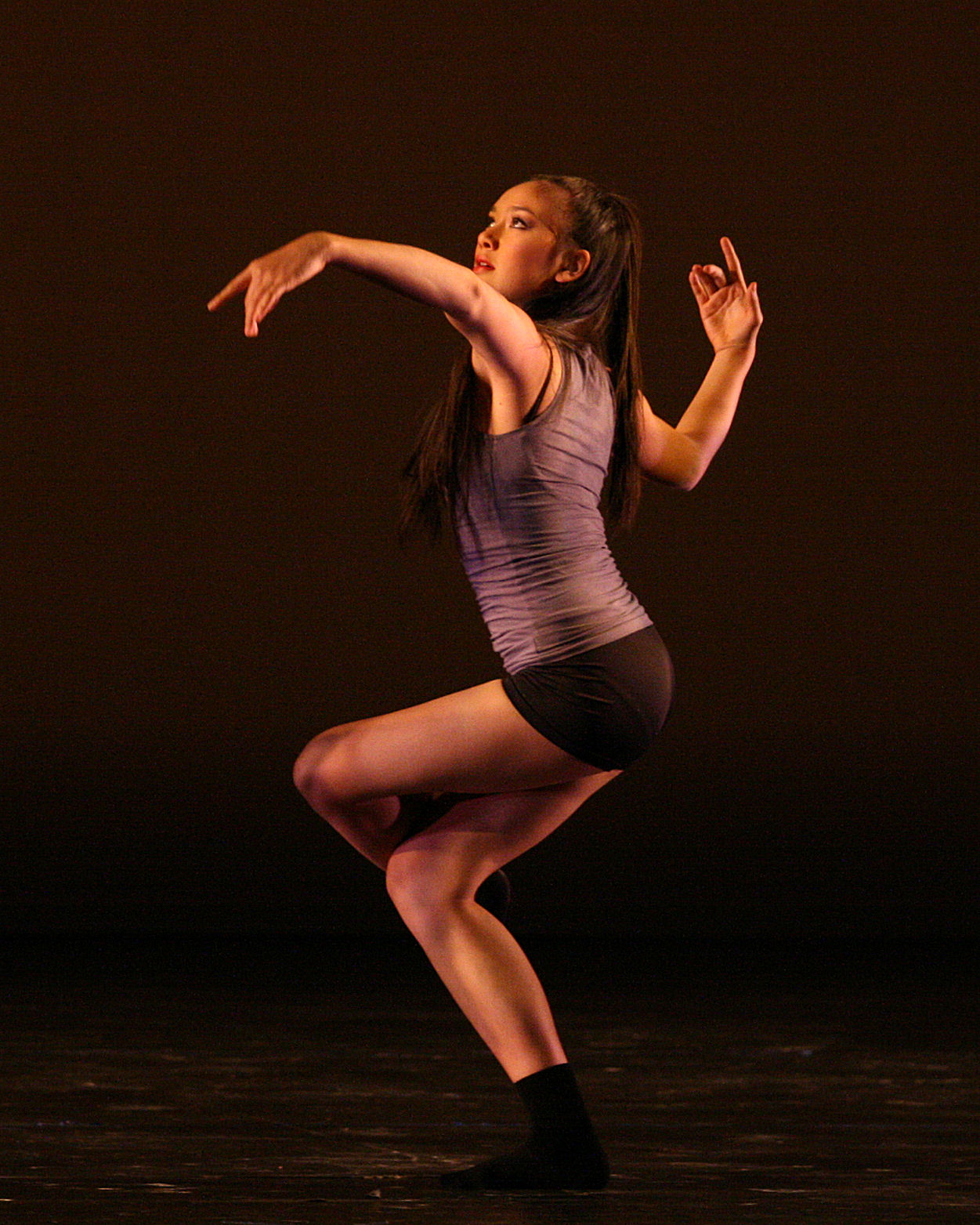
A dancer performing a beautiful contemporary dance piece

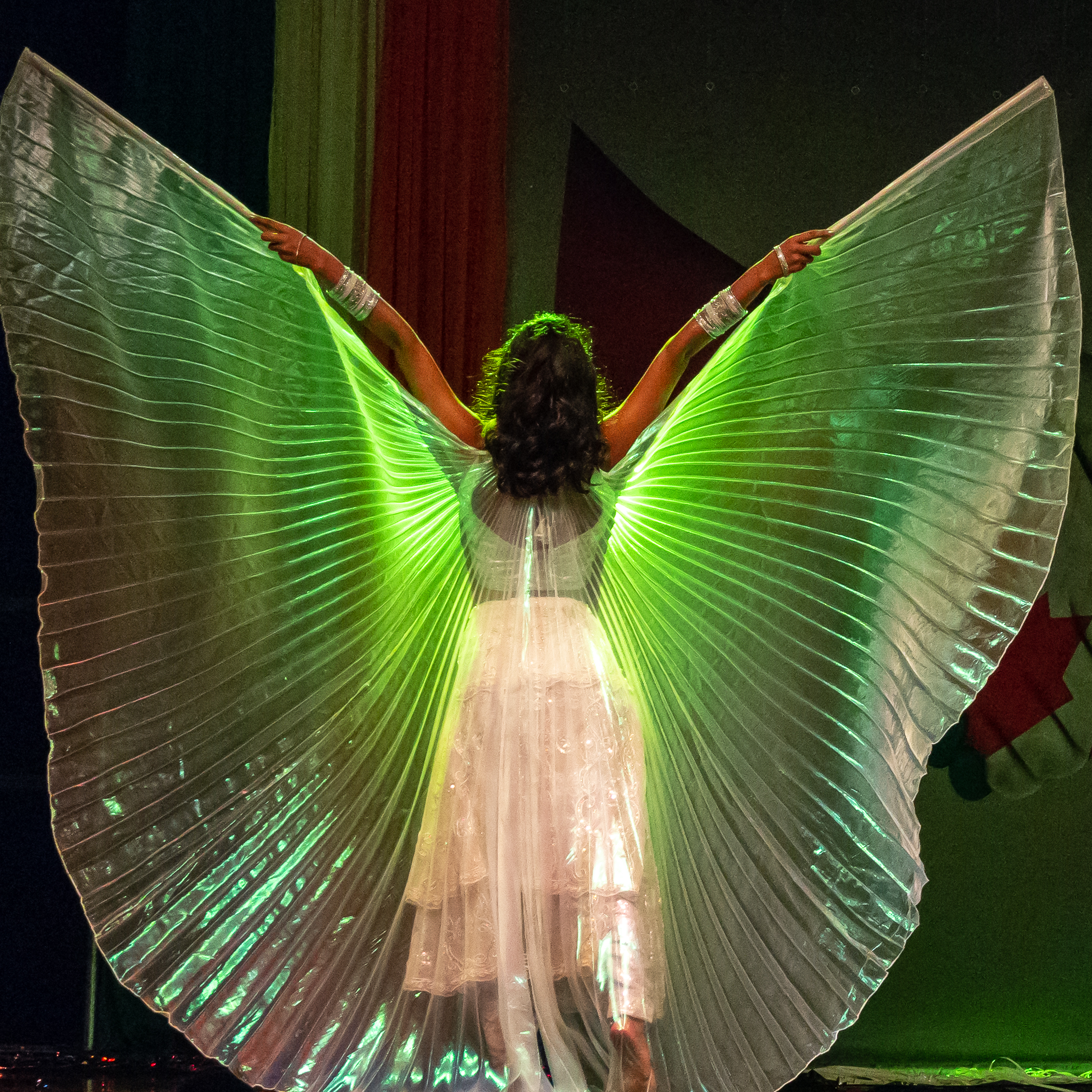
Indian contemporary dancer at 2018 Folklorama festival, Winnipeg

Contemporary dance is a genre of dance performance that developed during the mid-twentieth century and has since grown to become one of the dominant genres for formally trained dancers throughout the world, with particularly strong popularity in the U.S. and Europe. Although originally informed by and borrowing from classical, modern, and jazz styles, it has come to incorporate elements from many styles of dance. Due to its technical similarities, it is often perceived to be closely related to modern dance, ballet, and other classical concert dance styles.

In terms of technique, contemporary dance tends to combine the strong but controlled legwork of ballet with modern dance that stresses on torso. It also employs contract-release, floor work, fall and recovery, and improvisation characteristics of modern dance. Unpredictable changes in rhythm, speed, and direction are often used as well. Contemporary dance sometimes incorporates elements of non-western dance cultures, such as elements from African dance including bent knees, or movements from the Japanese contemporary dance, Butoh.

Contemporary dance also examines the concepts of choreography and dramaturgy. The distinction between composition and improvisation, as well as between finished works and ongoing processes, is collapsed in the style of contemporary dance. This dissolution between previously rigid distinctions parallels broader cultural shifts from what scholar Gabrielle Klein calls the "linguistic turn," which treated dance as a form of text and choreography as a structured linguistic system, to the subsequent "performative turn" which critiques representational practices and introduces new themes central to contemporary choreography. These themes include liveness, immediacy, authenticity, identity, and the interplay between presence and absence. As a result, contemporary dance works have become platforms for exploring complex themes, such as the unrepresentable and intangible aspects of human existence, which are difficult to represent using traditional and classical movement forms.

== History ==
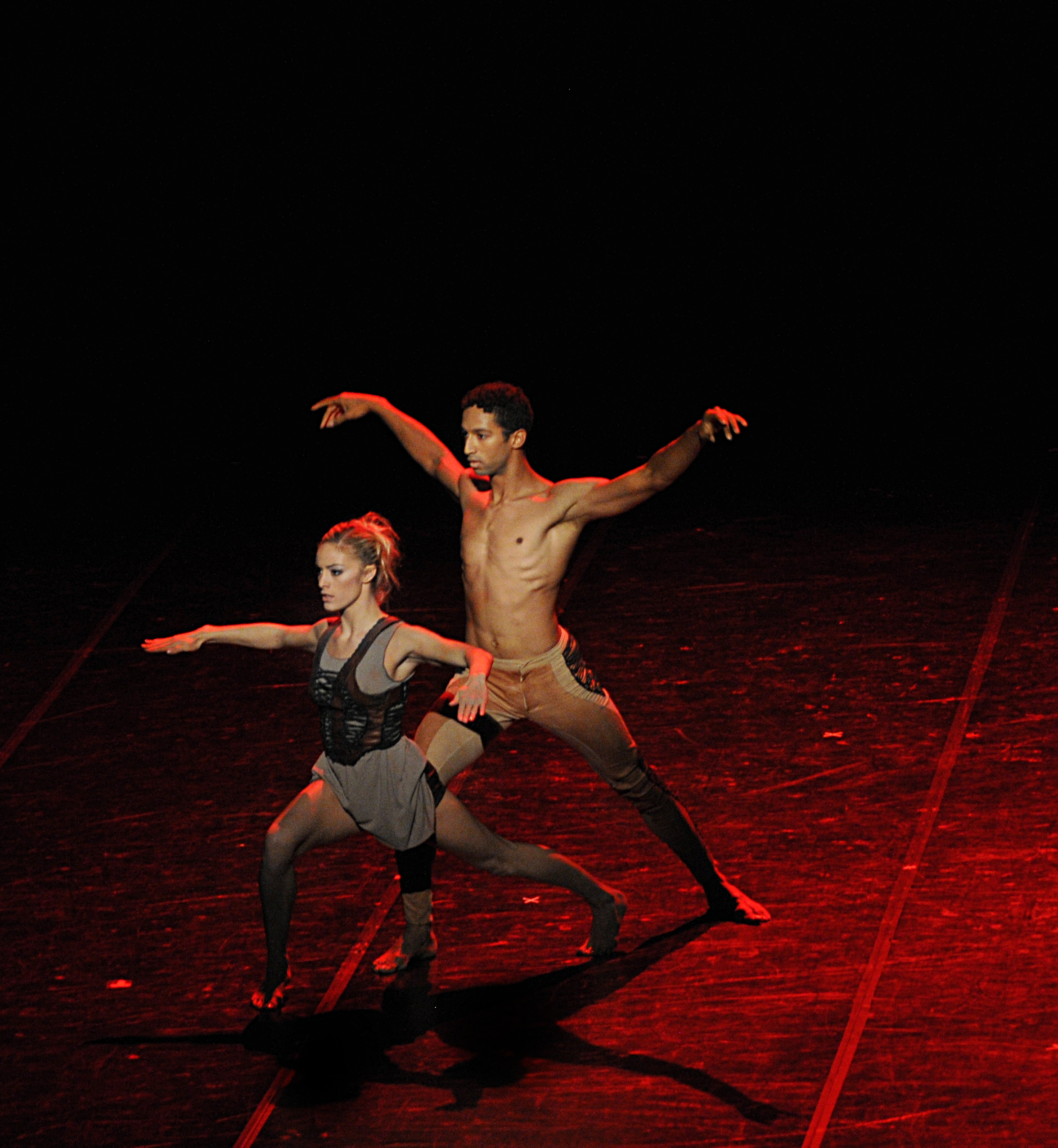
Contemporary dance performed by Le Sacre

Contemporary dance draws on both classical ballet and modern dance, whereas postmodern dance was a direct and opposite response to modern dance. Merce Cunningham is considered to be the first choreographer to "develop an independent attitude towards modern dance" and defy the ideas that were established by it. In 1944 Cunningham accompanied his dance with music by John Cage, who observed that Cunningham's dance "no longer relies on linear elements (...) nor does it rely on a movement towards and away from climax. As in abstract painting, it is assumed that an element (a movement, a sound, a change of light) is in and of itself expressive; what it communicates is in large part determined by the observer themselves." Cunningham formed the Merce Cunningham Dance Company in 1953 and went on to create more than one hundred and fifty works for the company, many of which have been performed internationally by ballet and modern dance companies.

Additionally, the emergence of Tanztheater, German for “dance theater,” pushed contemporary dance beyond traditional performance boundaries. This genre incorporated everyday movements and blurred the distinction between art and daily life. Tanztheater steered contemporary dance away from linear narratives toward fragmented and montage-like choreography, giving rise to a style marked by disjointed "dance pieces" rather than narrative styles.

== Cunningham's key ideas ==
Cunningham's key ideas include-

- Contemporary dance does refuse the classical ballet's leg technique in favour of modern dance's stress on the torso
- Contemporary dance is not necessarily narrative form of art
- Choreography that appears disordered, but nevertheless relies on technique
- Unpredictable changes in rhythm, speed, and direction
- Multiple and simultaneous actions
- Suspension of perspective and symmetry in ballet scenic frame perspective such as front, center, and hierarchies
- Creative freedom
- Independence between dance and music
- Dance to be danced, not analyzed
- Innovative lighting, sets, and costumes in collaboration with Andy Warhol, Robert Rauschenberg, and Jasper Johns

Other pioneers of contemporary dance (the offspring of modern and postmodern) include Ruth St. Denis, Doris Humphrey, Mary Wigman, Pina Bausch, Francois Delsarte, Émile Jaques-Dalcroze, Paul Taylor, Rudolph von Laban, Loie Fuller, José Limón, Marie Rambert, and Trisha Brown.

== Choreographer's role ==
There is usually a choreographer who makes the creative decisions and decides whether the piece is an abstract or a narrative one. Dancers are selected based on their skill and training. The choreography is determined based on its relation to the music or sounds that are danced to. The role of music in contemporary dance is different from in other genres because it can serve as a backdrop to the piece. The choreographer has control over the costumes and their aesthetic value for the overall composition of the performance and also in regards to how they influence dancers’ movements.

== Dance technique ==
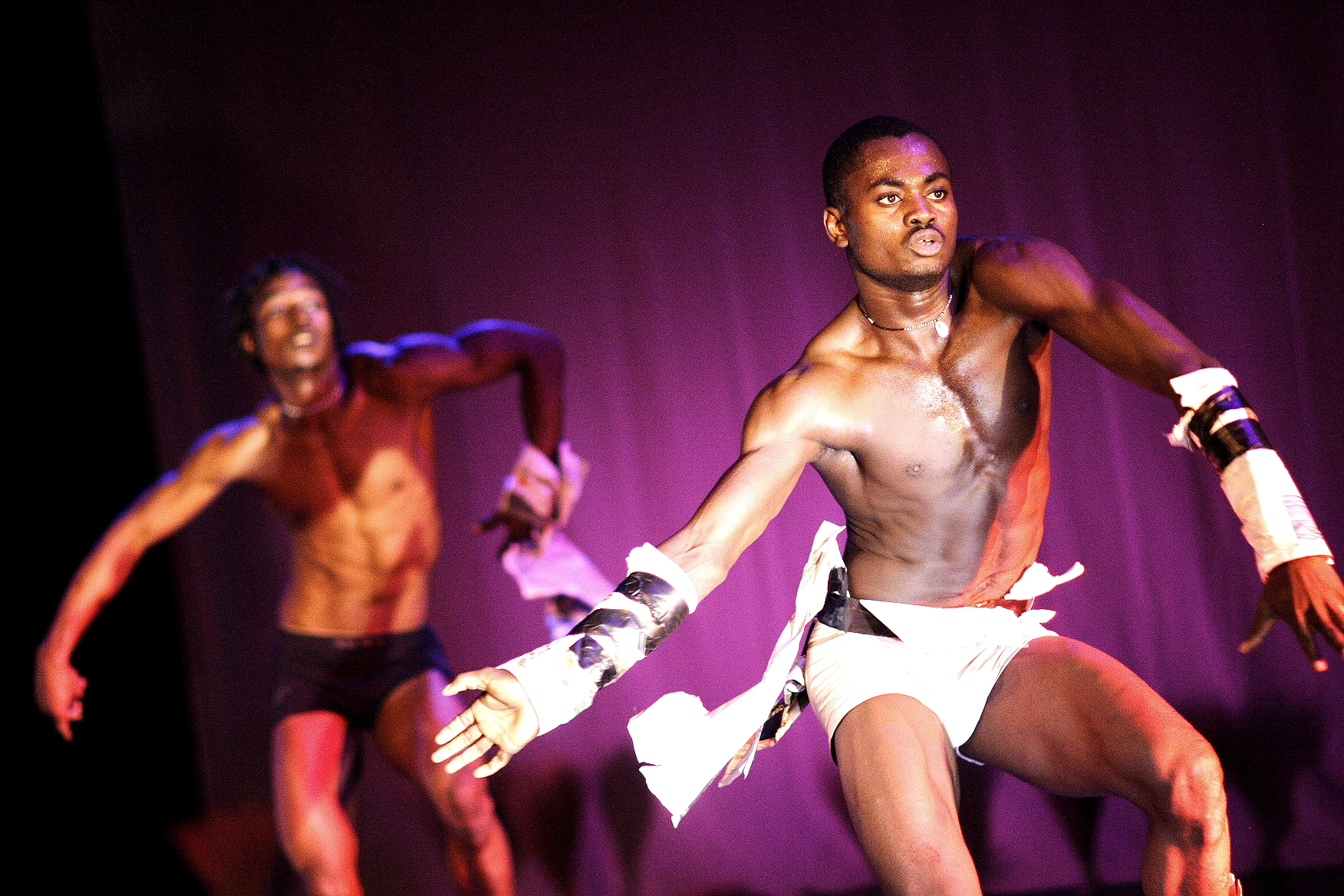
Le Sacre du Tempo

Post-structuralist thought has significantly influenced contemporary dance. This influence has led to a deeper exploration of the dancer’s primary medium, the body, which sparked the development and integration of innovative movement techniques. Dance techniques and movement philosophies employed in contemporary dance may include contemporary ballet, dance improvisation, interpretive dance, lyrical dance, modern dance styles from United States such as Graham technique, Humphrey-Weidman technique and Horton technique, modern dance of Europe Bartenieff fundamentals and the dance technique of Isadora Duncan (also see Free dance).

Contemporary dancers train using contemporary dance techniques as well as non-dance related practices such as Pilates, yoga, the acting practice of corporeal mime - Étienne Decroux technique and somatic practices such as Alexander technique, Feldenkrais method, Sullivan technique and Franklin method, American contemporary techniques such as José Limón technique and Hawkins technique and postmodern dance techniques such as contact improvisation and Cunningham technique, and release technique.

Some well-known choreographers and creators of contemporary dance created schools and techniques of their own. Paul Taylor developed a dance technique called Taylor technique, which is now taught at modern dance schools like The Ailey School in New York City.

Additionally, choreographers like William Forsythe developed techniques that deconstructed classical dance vocabulary and expanded both the technical and conceptual possibilities of contemporary dance. According to the International Encyclopedia of Dance, William Forsythe has established a framework for his conceptual ballets which do not conform to a fixed style but instead integrate elements from various trends in contemporary art and thought. His productions utilize language, song, film, video, sculpture, and electronic sounds, as well as amplified noises generated by the dancers. His choreography incorporates academic dance terminology that imparts a classical quality to all of his works, even his most experimental pieces. William Forsythe has cited Rudolf Laban and his Space Harmony movement as an artistic influence, although his ballet technique is significantly shaped by George Balanchine. Through the combination of these influences, William Forsythe has developed a technique of dance characterized by its fragmented nature, which further expounds the subtle differences and interconnectedness of modern, postmodern, and contemporary dance.

== Dance and technology ==
Reflecting the situation in society at large, contemporary dance is increasingly incorporating overtly technological elements, and, in particular, robots. Robotics engineer/dancer Amy LaViers, for example, has incorporated cell phones in a contemporary dance piece calling attention to the issues surrounding our ever-increasing dependence on technology.

== See also ==
- Modern dance
- Contemporary ballet
- London Contemporary Dance School
- Category: Contemporary dancers
