= LIMS =

LIMS may refer to:

== Technology ==
- Laboratory information management system, a software-based information management tool for laboratories
- Laser ionization mass spectrometer, a laboratory device that uses a focused laser for microanalysis

== Institutes and research centers ==
- La Trobe Institute for Molecular Science, an Australian research institute based at La Trobe University
- Laban/Bartenieff Institute of Movement Studies, a non-profit institute involved in the training of certified Laban Movement Analysts
- Lizard Island Research Station, an Australian coral reef research station
- London Institute for Mathematical Sciences, a non-profit institute for physics and mathematics research

== Other ==
- Piacenza-San Damiano Air Base (ICAO airport code: LIMS) in Italy
- Land Information and Management System, Pakistan
