= Eve Gentry =

American modern dancer

- Born: Henrietta Greenhood; August 21, 1909; Los Angeles, California, U.S.
- Died: June 17, 1994 (aged 84); Santa Fe, New Mexico, U.S.
- Other names: Eve Brooks, Eve Gentry Brooks
- Known for: Modern dance, Pilates instruction

Eve Gentry (August 21, 1909 – June 17, 1994; née Henrietta Greenhood, and pseudonym Eve Brooks) was a modern dancer, and later a Pilates master instructor. She was an original disciple of Joseph Pilates, and a master teacher of his technique to generations of instructors. She helped found the Dance Notation Bureau in New York City and later in 1991 she co-founded the Institute for the Pilates Method in Santa Fe, New Mexico.

== Early life ==
Gentry was born on August 21, 1909, and grew up in San Bernardino, California. In 1917, she studied ballet, and folk dance.

Gentry was studying in Los Angeles when Martha Graham saw her perform and offered her a scholarship in New York City. Gentry performed with Hanya Holm in the Hanya Holm Dance Company in New York City from 1936 to 1942, and later founded her own group, the Eve Gentry Dancers. Additionally she studied Labanotation from Rudolf von Laban's students Irmgard Bartenieff and Irma Otto-Betz.

She danced under the name Henrietta Greenhood until 1945, when she professionally adopted Gentry, her husband's surname.

== Career ==
Her concern for preserving choreography led her to establish the Dance Notation Bureau in New York in 1940, with Ann Hutchinson Guest, Janey Price and Helen Priest Rogers. The Dance Notation Bureau promoted the ideas of Labanotation.

She was a charter faculty member of the High School for the Performing Arts (now Baltimore School for the Arts).

Persistent back and knee problems led her to investigate, and later teach, a system of physical conditioning devised by Joseph Pilates. She taught "Contrology" at the Pilates Studio in New York from 1938 through 1968. Gentry also taught "Pilates" in the early 1960s at New York University's, Tisch School of the Arts Theater Department.

In 1968, she moved to New Mexico, where she established a Pilates Studio on Camino de la Luz. In 1991, she co-founded the Institute for the Pilates Method in Santa Fe with Joan Breibart and Michele Larsson. Gentry is credited with founding the concept of imprinting in Pilates.

The first workshop was held in October 1991, taught by Gentry, using eight "Mini-Moves" inspired by the principles of Feldenkrais and Bartenieff. These Mini-Moves became the foundation of the Fundamentals which are the signature of the PhysicalMind Institute, the successor to the Institute for the Pilates Method. There are now 28 Fundamentals and they have been copied by most of the subsequent Pilates Certification companies who followed the distribution system originated by Joan Breibart.

She died at the age of 84 on June 17, 1994, at her home in Santa Fe, New Mexico.

== Awards ==
In 1979, she was given the "Pioneer of Modern Dance Award" by Bennington College. She was also deemed a Living Treasure by the State of New Mexico in 1989.
