= Doris Humphrey =

American dancer and choreographer

- Humphrey and dance partner Charles Weidman
- Born: October 17, 1895; Oak Park, Illinois, United States
- Died: December 29, 1958 (aged 63); New York, New York
- Known for: Dance and choreography
- Movement: Modern/contemporary dance
- Spouse: Charles Woodford (m. 1932)
- Children: Charles Humphrey Woodford (b. 1933)

Doris Batcheller Humphrey (October 17, 1895 – December 29, 1958) was an American dancer and choreographer of the early twentieth century. Along with her contemporaries Martha Graham and Katherine Dunham, Humphrey was one of the second generation modern dance pioneers who followed their forerunners – including Isadora Duncan, Ruth St. Denis, and Ted Shawn – in exploring the use of breath and developing techniques still taught today. As many of her works were annotated, Humphrey continues to be taught, studied and performed.

== Early life ==
Doris Humphrey in 1924.

Humphrey was born in Oak Park, Illinois, but grew up in Chicago, Illinois. She was the daughter of Horace Buckingham Humphrey, a journalist and one-time hotel manager, and Julia Ellen Wells, who had trained as a concert pianist. She was a descendant of pilgrim William Brewster who arrived on the Mayflower in 1620. In Chicago, with the encouragement of her mother, she studied with eminent ballet masters as well as with Mary Wood Hinman, who taught dance at her school, the Francis Parker School. While still at high school she undertook a concert tour of the western states as a dancer, with her mother as accompanist, in a group sponsored by the Santa Fe Railroad for its Workman's Clubs.

Partly due to financial concerns Humphrey opened her own dance school, with her mother as manager and pianist, in 1913 at the age of 18. It was a great success, offering classic, gymnastic and ballroom dance for children and ballroom dance for young adults.

In 1917, at the instigation of Mary Wood Hinman, she moved to California and entered the Denishawn School of Dancing and Related Arts where she studied, performed, taught classes and learned choreography. Her creations from this era, Valse Caprice (Scarf Dance), Soaring, and Scherzo Waltz (Hoop Dance) are all still performed today. She remained involved for the next decade. Humphrey toured the Orient for two years followed by a successful career in American vaudeville theaters.

== Personal life ==
Short in stature, Doris was no taller than 5'3" and had a slender build. In 1932 she married Charles Woodford (a Royal Navy merchant.) She had one child, a son named Charles Humphrey Woodford (born 1933).

== Dancing through the Great Depression ==
In 1928, Humphrey and Charles Weidman, who had worked closely with Humphrey, left the Denishawn School and moved to New York City. Along with Humphrey and Weidman, Martha Graham also rebelled against the Denishawn establishment during this time. Humphrey and Graham separately developed new ideas about the core dynamics of dance movement that eventually formed the basis of each of their techniques.

Humphrey's theory explored the nuances of the human body's responses to gravity, embodied in her principle of "fall and recovery". She called this "the arc between two deaths". At one extreme, an individual surrenders to the nature of gravity; at the other, one attempts to achieve balance. Through the fall and recovery principle, Humphrey is able to illustrate emotional and physical climax of struggling for stability and submitting to the laws of gravity.

Her choreography from these early years includes Air for the G String, Water Study, Life of the Bee, Two Ecstatic Themes, and The Shakers. Unlike the Denishawn approach in choreography, finding inspiration from abroad, Humphrey sought inspiration from within her home, America. The Shakers, about the 18th century American religious group, is a notable example of finding inspiration from America.

The Humphrey-Weidman Company was successful even in the Great Depression, touring America and developing new styles and new works based not on old tales but on current events and concerns. In the mid-1930s Humphrey created the "New Dance Trilogy", a triptych comprising With My Red Fires, New Dance, and the now-lost Theater Piece. Though the three pieces were never performed together, they were danced to the score by Wallingford Rigger. Here Humphrey looks at the competitive lives of businessmen, working women, athletes, and actors.

Humphrey was a participant of the Federal Dance Project (FDP), created in the 1930s as part of Franklin Delano Roosevelt's Second New Deal. FDP was the first national program created to financially support dance and dancers.

Humphrey expanded her choreographic work to Broadway in 1933 with School for Husbands and again the following year with Life Begins at 8:40.

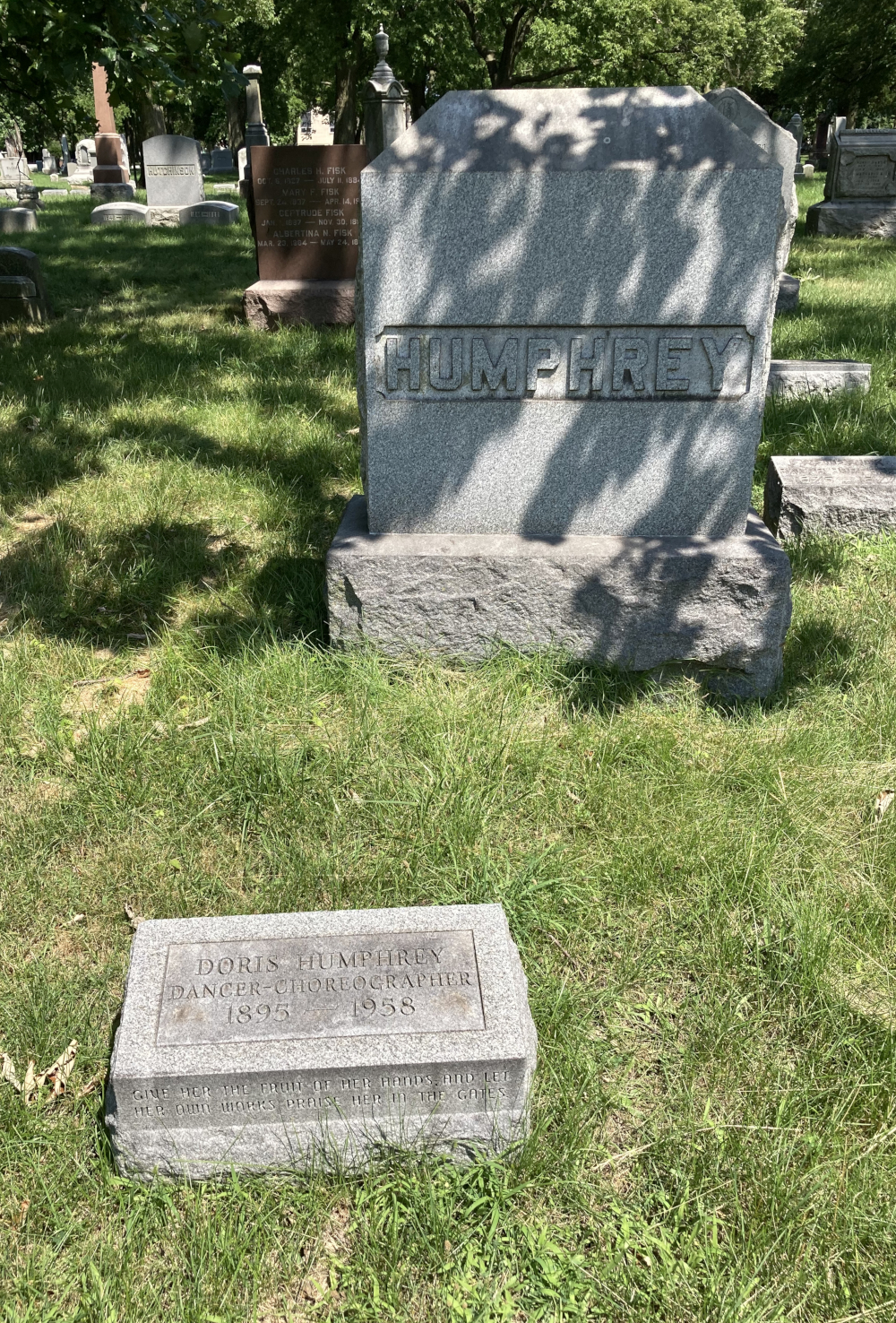
Humphrey's grave at Forest Home Cemetery in Forest Park, Illinois

During the 1940s, Humphrey spent significant time with José Limón, one of her former students. After she retired from performing in 1944, due to arthritis, she became artistic director for the José Limón Dance Company and created a number of works for the company, including Day on Earth, Night Spell, Ruins and Visions, and Lament for Ignacio Sanchez Mejias. Humphrey's dance style was carried on and developed further by Limón and his dance company.

One of her last pieces, Dawn in New York, showed the strengths Humphrey demonstrated throughout her career – her mastery of the intricacies of large groups and her emphasis on sculptural shapes. Humphrey was on the original faculties of both The Bennington School of the Dance (1934) and The Juilliard School (1951), both directed by Martha Hill.

In 1952 Humphrey started directing a new dance company for children called The Merry-Go-Rounders.

She died in New York City on December 29, 1958, and was buried at Forest Home Cemetery in Forest Park, Illinois.

== Choreographic works and movement theory ==
As previously stated, Humphrey had some very particular theories on the fundamentals of movement. Her theory of Fall and Recovery was the center point of all her movement. She described this as "The arc between two deaths." Moreover, this idea was based in the change in center of gravity, balance and recovery. Humphrey theorized that moving away from center should be followed by an equal adjustment to return to center to prevent a fall. The more dramatic the movement, the more dramatic the recovery should be.

Humphrey also believed that movement should represent emotion but not to the same extent that Graham had. Her eye was more clinical, in a way, with most of her works relating to the interactions of an individual or group. As Graham had, she also "believed that dance should provoke, stimulate, and inform rather than simply entertain." But where Graham had wished to explore the individual psyche, Humphrey wished to showcase individual and group dynamics from more of an outsider's perspective. This thought process translated into using dances as metaphors for human situations and working in mostly abstractions to represent specific characters, events, or ideas. For example, Two Ecstatic Themes (1931) explored Humphrey's own feelings about falling in love while still remaining a strong, independent woman.

Humphrey's most prominent works include Color Harmony (1928), Water Study (1928), Drama of Motion (1930), and The Shakers (1931). Color Harmony (1928) was her first independent concert after leaving Denishawn in 1928. She and Charles Weidman presented the work with "Weidman as a slivery figure representing the artistic intelligence that organizes the mingled colors of the spectrum into a harmonious design." Water Study (1928) was Humphrey's experiment of dancing without music. She wanted the dancers to move to their natural breathing patterns as they represented the natural movement of water. Drama of Motion (1930) was the next step in her experiment of dancing without music. She wanted dance to be an art that could stand on its own without the need of music or emotion and concentrated on the formal elements of movement such as design, rhythm, and dynamics. Her best known work however, brought music and emotion back into play. The Shakers (1931) was inspired by a Christian sect known as Shakers. They required members to be celibate and are known for shaking during times of worship. To make sure their members remain celibate they segregate the sexes during rituals. In Humphrey's choreography she incorporates shaking movements to represent their sexual repression as well as the idea of being shaken clean of sin.

== Legacy ==
Shortly after her death in 1958, Humphrey's book The Art of Making Dances, in which she shared her observations and theories on dance and composition, was published. In the introduction she observed that ballet had changed radically in the 20th century. "Suddenly the dance," she said, "the Sleeping Beauty, so long reclining in her dainty bed, had risen up with a devouring desire." She believed in emotions and movement moving "from the inside out", but she also believed in working abstractly where specific events and characters were not illustrated in a way that made sense. For example, "she believed that the concept of democracy was more convincingly conveyed by a fugue uniting four different themes than by a woman in red, white and blue".

Her theory of Fall and Recovery is still used to this day by many choreographers.

Thirty-five of Doris Humphrey's dances are documented in Labanotation by the Dance Notation Bureau. Introductory material includes original casts, history of the dances, stylistic notes, and other information.

The book, Days on Earth: The Dance of Doris Humphrey, by Marcia B. Siegel was published in 1993. Siegel makes a case for Humphrey being one of the more important figures of modern dance.

Humphrey was inducted into the National Museum of Dance's Mr. & Mrs. Cornelius Vanderbilt Whitney Hall of Fame in 1987.

A street in her home town of Oak Park is named for her paternal grandfather, the Reverend Simon James Humphrey.

== See also ==
- List of dancers
- Women in dance
