= Laban/Bartenieff Institute of Movement Studies =

American dance therapy school

The Laban/Bartenieff Institute of Movement Studies (LIMS) in New York was founded in 1978 as a center for the development and study of the principles of Laban Movement Analysis, formulated by Rudolf Laban and further developed by his student and colleague Irmgard Bartenieff. The institute maintains a library and media resource center that includes published and unpublished text, films and photographs on the subject of Laban Movement Analysis.

== History ==
In 1925 Irmgard Bartenieff met Rudolf Laban, a dancer and theoretician celebrated for his radical ideas in dance notation and movement. From 1925 to 1927 she studied with Laban, and then continued to work and teach with him in the schools he had founded throughout Germany.

In the early 1960s, Irmgard taught courses in Effort/Shape at the Dance Notation Bureau in New York City, where she had been a senior faculty member since 1943. Before that she was already applying Effort/Shape to various areas, such as psychology, physical therapy, child development, anthropology and performing arts. As a physical therapist for example, she led polio patients through imagery to experience shapes and dynamic qualities in their movement exercises.

In 1965 Bartenieff, with her assistants Forrestine Paulay and Martha Davis, started the Effort/Shape department at the Dance Notation Bureau to extend the notation training to observations of affinities between shaping and the dynamic aspects of movement.

In 1973 the Dance Notation Bureau initiated an in-depth, graduate program of training that combines of Laban and Bartenieff's theories and practices of movement study and analyses. In 1978 Bartenieff branched off to found her own Laban Institute of Movement Studies, which in 1981, the year she died, was renamed the Laban/Bartenieff Institute of Movement Studies (LIMS). The institute is dedicated to training professionals in the analysis system and furthering its development and application. LMA concepts are used in a variety of contexts, and like Labanotation, its use requires extensive training.

== Programs ==
LIMS is a non-profit educational and research institute involved in the training of certified Laban Movement Analysts and in the multidisciplinary study of human movement as applicable to dance/arts/theatre/sports/fitness/education/therapies/social sciences. LIMS offers a Certification Program in Laban Movement Studies, as well as Applied Laban in Communication and Hands-on and Re-Patterning.

LIMS is an accredited institutional member of the National Association of Schools of Dance (NASD), designated by the U.S. Department of Education as a national accrediting body, and is an International Somatic Movement Education and Therapy Association (ISMETA)-approved training program.
