= Ann Hutchinson Guest =

American dance notator (1918–2022)

Ann Hutchinson Guest MBE
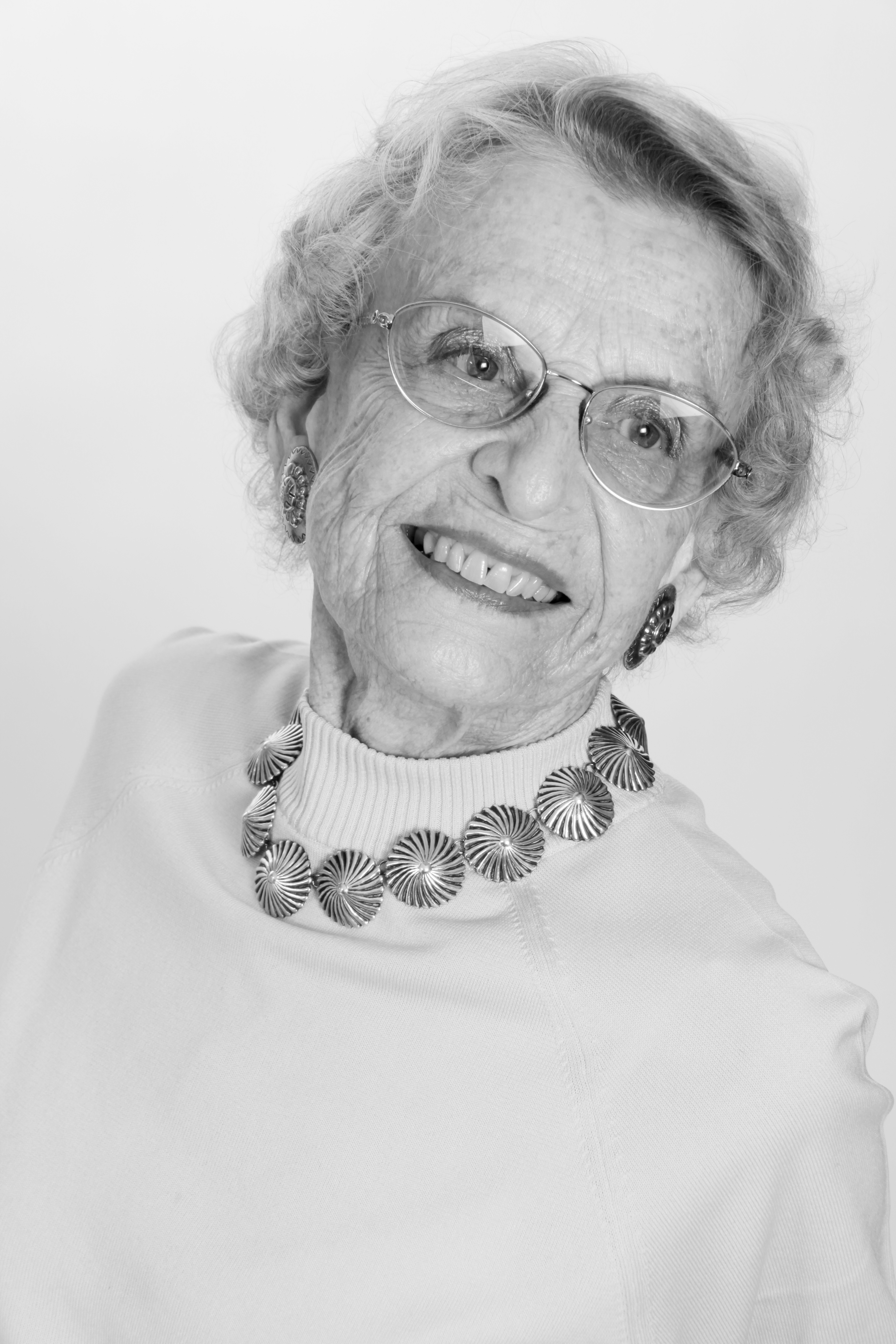
- Guest in 2009
- Born: Ann Hutchinson; 3 November 1918; New York City, U.S.
- Died: 9 April 2022 (aged 103); Kensington, London, England
- Education: Dartington Hall
- Known for: Language of Dance, Labanotation, dance notation
- Spouses: Richard "Rickey" Traetino "Trent" (m. 1946; div. 1954) Ivor Forbes Guest (m. 1962; died 2018)

Ann Hutchinson Guest MBE (née Hutchinson; 3 November 1918 – 9 April 2022) was an American authority on dance notation and movement analysis, long based in the United Kingdom. She studied more than 80 dance notation systems and translated 20 to Labanotation. This gave her access to a number of dance works in their original version – such as Vaslav Nijinsky's L'Après-midi d'un Faune. Her extensive research, performing, and teaching career led her to establish the "Language of Dance" approach to empower educators, artists, researchers, and other professionals in their study and use of Motif notation to engage and deepen movement understanding.

== Career ==
Hutchinson Guest studied Labanotation with Sigurd Leeder at Dartington Hall in England from 1936 to 1939 and trained in modern dance and ballet. In New York, she co-founded and directed the Dance Notation Bureau, danced on Broadway and taught at the Juilliard School, the High School of the Performing Arts, the Philadelphia Dance Academy, and the Royal Academy of Dance, where she created the Language of Dance Centre UK.

== Personal life and death ==
Ann Hutchinson Guest was born on 3 November 1918, in New York City. She spent most of her childhood growing up in England (Littlehampton, Sussex; and Spelmanten, Kent, before attending Dartington Hall in Totnes, Devon). For two years, she resided in Tunbridge Wells, Kent until the house was taken over by the army and her parents returned to London and she returned to the United States, age 21. In the 1940s, she had a brief marriage with Ricky Trent, a trumpeter she had met while performing in One Touch of Venus. She performed on Broadway from 1945 to 1951 and taught at the High School of Performing Arts, Philadelphia Dance Academy, and Juilliard School of Dance until moving to London to marry Ivor Guest where she created the Language of Dance Centre UK and taught at the Royal Academy of Dance. In 1962, she married dance historian Ivor Forbes Guest and they remained together until his death in 2018. She spent summers in her cottage on Goose Pond, in Lee, Massachusetts enjoying activities at Jacob's Pillow Dance Festival.

Hutchinson Guest died from heart failure at her home in Kensington, London, on 9 April 2022, aged 103.

== Awards and honours ==
For her contribution to dance research and education, Hutchinson Guest was awarded two honorary doctorates as well as many lifetime achievement awards. In 1997, she received the "Outstanding Contribution to Dance Research" award from the Congress on Research in Dance (CORD). In 1998, she was awarded a Guggenheim Fellowship for Dance Studies.

In 2021, Hutchinson Guest was appointed an honorary Member of the Most Excellent Order of the British Empire (MBE) by Queen Elizabeth II. It was made substantive in 2022 shortly before her death, indicating she had taken British nationality.

== Works ==
- Guest, Ann Hutchinson (1998). Choreo-graphics: a comparison of dance notation systems from the fifteenth century to the present. Gordon and Breach. ISBN 9789057000034. OCLC 50987415.
- Guest, Ann Hutchinson (2004). Labanotation, or, Kinetography Laban: the system of analyzing and recording movement. Routledge. ISBN 978-0-415-96561-3. OCLC 63092928.
- Guest, Ann Hutchinson and Tina Curran (2008). Your Move: A New Approach to the Study of Movement and Dance. Taylor & Francis. ISBN 978-0415978927.
- Guest, Ann Hutchinson; Victoria, Felisa; Zorn, Friedrich Albert (2007). Fanny Elssler's Cachucha. Dance. ISBN 978-0-903102-59-9. OCLC 619750021.
- Guest, Ann Hutchinson; Jeschke, Claudia (2010). Nijinsky's Faune restored: a study of Vaslav Nijinsky's 1915 dance score : L'après-midi d'un faune and his dance notation system : revealed, translated into labanotation and annotated. Noverre Press. ISBN 978-1-906830-16-8. OCLC 722720257.
- Guest, Ann Hutchinson (2017). A selection from the Sigurd Leeder heritage. Noverre Press. ISBN 978-1-906830-81-6. OCLC 989698594.
