= Laban notation symbols =

Symbols used to record human movement

Laban Notation Symbols generally refers to the wide range of notation symbols (or signs) developing from the original work of Rudolf Laban and used in many different types of Laban Movement Study such as Labanotation and Laban Movement Analysis for graphically representing human body positions and movements.

== History ==
see Rudolf Laban.

== Notation staff ==
The concept of a "staff" is borrowed from music and the musical staff. It provides the basic framework for notating.

== Spatial symbols ==
Several different methods have developed for notating space.

=== Direction symbols ===
In Labanotation the direction symbols are organized as three levels: high, middle, and low (or deep):

27 Direction Symbols in Labanotation
(Hover mouse over symbols to see their names)
High Level	forward-left-high	forward-high	forward-right-high	left-forward-high	forward-high	right-forward-high
High Level	left-high	place-high	right-high	left-high	place-high	right-high
High Level	backward-left-high	backward-high	backward-right-high	left-back-high	back-high	right-back-high
Middle Level	left-forward-middle	forward-middle	right-forward-middle	left-forward-middle	forward-middle	right-forward-middle
Middle Level	left-middle	place-middle	right-middle	left-middle	place-middle	right-middle
Middle Level	left-back-middle	back-middle	right-back-middle	left-back-middle	back-middle	right-back-middle
Low Level	forward-left-deep	forward-low	forward-right-deep	left-forward-Low	forward-Low	right-forward-Low
Low Level	left-deep	place-low	right-deep	left-Low	place-Low	right-Low
Low Level	backward-left-deep	backward-deep	backward-right-deep	left-back-Low	back-Low	right-back-Low

In Laban Movement Analysis and Space Harmony (Choreutics) the same 27 direction symbols are used but they have a different conceptualization. Instead of envisaging the signs on three parallel horizontal planes (high, middle, and low levels), the direction signs are organized according to the octahedron, cube (hexahedron), and the icosahedron.

=== Vector motion symbols ===
In his early German publication Choreographie, Rudolf Laban used a different group of spatial directional signs which represented orientation of lines of motion (rather than orientations of limb positions).

These signs were translated into modern-day Labanotation signs, and referred to as "vector signs".

General Scheme of Rudolf Laban's Vector Signs
(Hover mouse over symbols to see their names) .
				8 Diagonals (regular 45 degree orientations)							
				up-left-forward	down-right-backward	up-right-forward	down-left-backward	up-left-backward	down-right-forward	up-right-backward	down-left-forward
3 Dimensions				Diagonal motion oriented upward-forward-leftward	Diagonal motion oriented downward-rightward-backward	Diagonal motion oriented upward-forward-rightward	Diagonal motion oriented downward-leftward-backward	Diagonal motion oriented upward-backward-leftward	Diagonal motion oriented downward-rightward-forward	Diagonal motion oriented upward-backward-rightward	Diagonal motion oriented downward-leftward-forward
Vertical	CAPTION	CAPTION	-	CAPTION	CAPTION	CAPTION	CAPTION	CAPTION	CAPTION	CAPTION	CAPTION
Sagittal	CAPTION	CAPTION	-	CAPTION	CAPTION	CAPTION	CAPTION	CAPTION	CAPTION	CAPTION	CAPTION
Lateral	CAPTION	CAPTION	-	CAPTION	CAPTION	CAPTION	CAPTION	CAPTION	CAPTION	CAPTION	CAPTION
				24 Inclinations (irregular deflected, tilted orientations)							

== Symbols for relationships ==
"Relationships"' is used in a broad sense to refer to interactions amongst two or more bodies, for example awareness, focus, nearness, contact, physical weight support. Many fine distinctions have been deciphered. These have some relationship to Proxemics.
