= Ivor Forbes Guest =

British historian

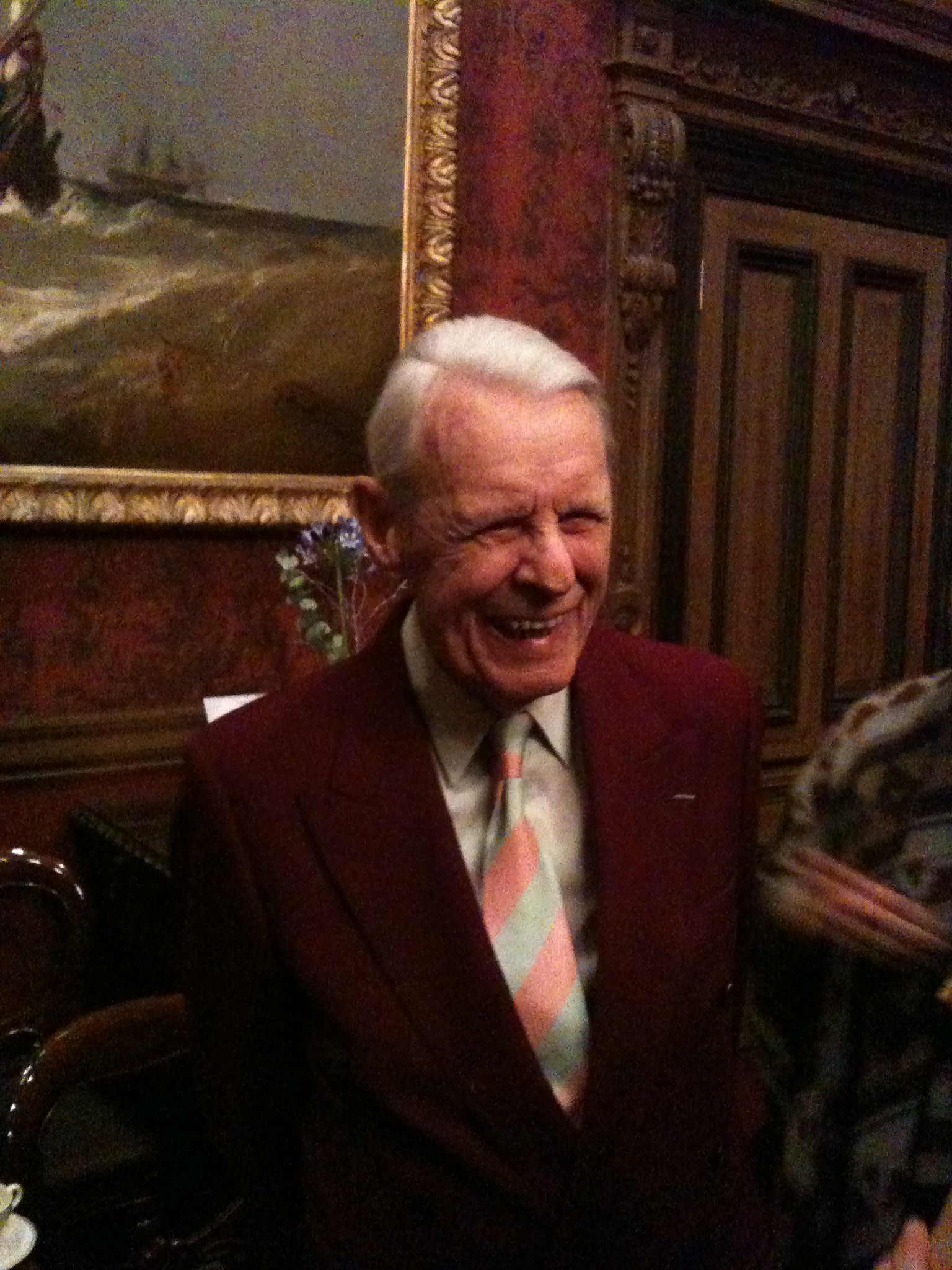
- Guest in 2010
- Born: 14 April 1920; Chislehurst, England
- Died: 30 March 2018 (aged 97); London, England
- Occupations: Historian, lawyer and administrator
- Spouse: Ann Hutchinson Guest (m. 1962)
- Relatives: Ernest Lucas Guest (uncle)
- Writing career
- Period: 1953–2008
- Genre: History
- Subjects: Ballet, Napoleon III
- Notable awards: Ordre des Arts et des Lettres; 2000

Ivor Forbes Guest DUniv MA FRAD (14 April 1920 – 30 March 2018) was a British historian and writer, best known for his study of ballet. He was chairman of the Royal Academy of Dance for twenty three years (1970–93) and has been a Vice-President since 1993 and Secretary then Trustee of the Radcliffe Trust. In 1997 he was made a Doctor of the University by the University of Surrey, its highest honorary doctorate.

He was married to the movement notation expert Ann Hutchinson Guest and acted as a trustee of the Language of Dance Centre, which she founded.

== Early life ==
Ivor Guest was born on 14 April 1920 in Chislehurst, Kent, England. Guest's father, Cecil Marmaduke Guest served as a lieutenant in the Transvaal Scottish in the First World War and was later made up to captain, serving with the South African Scottish in France, where he was gassed. Declared unfit for further service he remained in England. He married Ivor's mother, Christian Forbes-Tweedie on 30 July 1918.

== Ballet historian ==
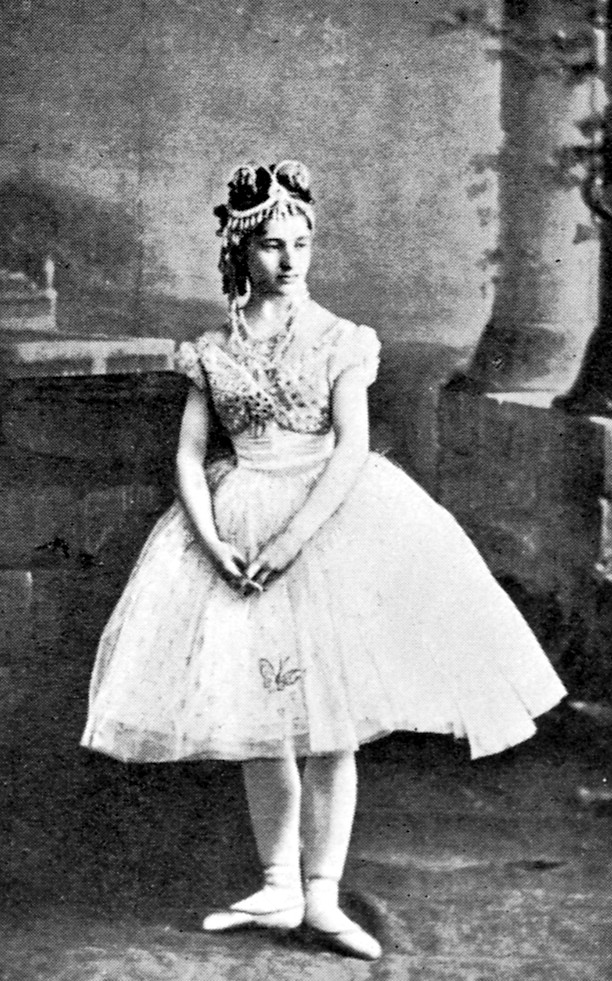
Photo of the ballerina Giuseppina Bozzachi (1853–1870) costumed as Swanilda in the ballet Coppélia. Paris, France, 1870, reproduced in Guest's The Ballet of the Second Empire

Guest's first book, Napoleon III in England (1952), came from an interest in his birth town's association with the exiled Napoleon III. Then, despite a successful career as a lawyer, Guest spent holidays and other leisure time researching the ballet of the Second Empire in the archives of the Bibliothèque de l'Opéra in Paris, producing two volumes on the subject entitled The Ballet of the Second Empire (1953, 1955).

He received tributes in Dance Research: The Journal of the Society for Dance Research in 1995, the year of his 75th birthday; and in Dance Chronicle in 2001. Guest died in London on 30 March 2018, at age 97.

== Publications ==
Guest's writing focuses primarily on the ballet in Paris, at the Opéra, in the years 1770 to 1870. He also chronicles the international careers of some of ballet's stars.

=== Ballet ===
- The Ballet of the Second Empire, A. and C. Black (1953) ASIN B0007ITA5G
- Fanny Cerrito: Life of a Romantic Ballerina, London: Phoenix House, (1956)
- Victorian ballet-girl,: The tragic story of Clara Webster, A. and C. Black (1957), 136 pages ASIN B0006AVBAM
- Adeline Genée: a lifetime of ballet under six reigns; based on the personal reminiscences of Dame Adeline Genée-Isitt, D.B.E., A. and C. Black, 1958, 207 pages
- The Alhambra ballet, Dance Perspectives, inc., 1959, 72 pages
- The Dancer's Heritage: A Short History of Ballet, Adam & Charles Black; First Edition & First Printing edition (1 Jan 1960), ISBN 0-900327-04-9
- La fille mal gardée, Dancing Times, 1960, 71 pages
- Dandies and dancers, Dance Perspectives Foundation, 1969, 49 pages
- Fanny Elssler, A & C Black Publishers Ltd (28 May 1970), 284 pages ISBN 0-7136-1061-1
- Romantic Ballet in England, Pitman Publishing; 2nd Revised edition (27 June 1972), 195 pages ISBN 0-273-36120-1
- Letters from a Ballet Master: The Correspondence of Arthur Saint-Léon (1981), 158 pages ISBN 978-0-87127-123-5
- Adventures of a Ballet Historian, Dance Horizons; 1st edition (28 March 1983), 131 pages ISBN 0-903102-69-2
- Jules Perrot, Princeton Book Company Publishers (December 1984), 383 pages ISBN 0-87127-140-0
- Ballet in Leicester Square: The Alhambra and the Empire 1860–1915, Dance Books (May 1992), 192 pages ISBN 1-85273-034-X
- The Ballet of the Enlightenment: The Establishment of the Ballet D'Action in France, 1770–1793, Princeton Book Company Publishers (February 1997), 456 pages ISBN 1-85273-049-8
- Ballet Under Napoleon, Dance Horizons (May 2002), 584 pages ISBN 1-85273-082-X
- The Paris Opera Ballet, Princeton Book Co Pub (30 April 2006), 160 pages ISBN 1-85273-109-5
- The Romantic Ballet in Paris, Dance Books Ltd (1 February 2008), 472 pages ISBN 1-85273-119-2
- The Divine Virginia: Biography of Virginia Zucchi, Dance Books (10 July 2008), 204 pages ISBN 0-8247-6492-7
- Guest, Ivor (1954). "Sylvia: From Mérante to Ashton". The Ballet Annual. 8 (1954): 67–72.
- Guest, Ivor (1977). ""La Fille mal gardée": New Light on the Original Production". Dance Chronicle. 1 (1). Taylor & Francis, Ltd.: 3–7. doi:10.1080/01472527708568702. JSTOR 1567492.
- Guest, Ivor (1978). "Letters: Ballet in Early Nineteenth-Century London as Seen by Leigh Hunt and Henry Robertson". Dance Chronicle. 2 (2). Taylor & Francis, Ltd.: 157. doi:10.1080/01472527808568728. JSTOR 1567479.
- Guest, Ivor (Spring 1983). "Cesare Pugni: A Plea for Justice". Dance Research: The Journal of the Society for Dance Research. 1 (1). Edinburgh University Press: 30–38. doi:10.2307/1290799. JSTOR 1290799.
- Guest, Ivor (Summer 1984). "Archives of the Dance: The Library and the Archives of the Paris Opéra: The Opéra Preserved". Dance Research: The Journal of the Society for Dance Research. 2 (2). Edinburgh University Press: 68–76. doi:10.2307/1290636. JSTOR 1290636.
- Guest, Ivor (1987). "Théophile Gautier on Spanish Dancing". Dance Chronicle. 10 (1). Taylor & Francis, Ltd.: 1–104. doi:10.1080/01472528608568938. JSTOR 1567610.
- Guest, Ivor (1995). "Letters from London: Guimard's Farewell to the Stage". Dance Chronicle. 18 (2). Taylor & Francis, Ltd.: 207–215. doi:10.1080/01472529508569197. JSTOR 1567874.
- Guest, Ivor (Summer 2003). ""Le Bal Masqué:" A Project for a Carnival Ballet by Pierre Gardel". Dance Research: The Journal of the Society for Dance Research. 21 (1). Edinburgh University Press: 27–41. doi:10.2307/1290940. JSTOR 1290940.

=== Other history ===
- Napoleon III in England, London, British Technical and General Press; 1st Edition. edition (1 Jan 1952), 212 pages ASIN B0006DASOE
- Dr. John Radcliffe and his Trust, Radcliffe Trust, 1991, 595 pages ISBN 0-9502482-1-5

== Honours ==
In 1997, he was awarded the Queen Elizabeth II Coronation Award for services to ballet which is the RAD's highest honour; he was given a Lifetime Achievement Award. In 2000 he received the Ordre des Arts et des Lettres.

== See also ==
- Le Corsaire
- La fille mal gardée
- Fanny Elssler
- Marius Petipa
- Cesare Pugni
- Palais Garnier
- Virginia Zucchi
- Her Majesty's Theatre
