= Bartenieff =

Bartenieff is a surname. Notable people with the surname include:

- George Bartenieff (1933–2022), American stage and film actor
- Irmgard Bartenieff (1900–1981), German-American dance theorist, dancer, choreographer, physical and dance therapist
