= Low-quantity diet =

Type of weight-loss diet

A low-quantity diet is a weight-loss diet that restricts the amount of food eaten, rather than caloric intake or the type of food eaten. These diets are based on the claim that the amount of food eaten is the primary factor in weight-loss. Typically, low-quantity diets focus on restricting the number of bites eaten in a day as a way to achieve portion control.

== History ==
The first diet plan focused on bite-counting was developed by Dr. Richard G. Black from the Seattle Pain Clinic. This diet was designed for patients in severe pain, who often also suffered from obesity. The diet was designed to reduce the amount of food eaten, without putting any additional strain on the dieter or requiring a major lifestyle change. Dieters would count the number of bites of food they ate in a day as well as measure their weight each day. They would then adjust down the number of bites of food they took each day until they began losing weight. The diet was marketed for its simplicity and that it allows dieters to eat any type of food. The argumentation of Dr. Black was that bites are a natural way to measure food intake and that they are easy to track.

In 1978, following the publication of Dr. Black's diet, Water Pik developed a hand-held bite-counting computer that could be used at meal times.

A similar diet was developed in the late 1980s by Joan Breibart, a Pilates expert, and Meredith Luce, a dietician. Originally called Diet Directives and later changed to 80Bites, this diet also focuses on restricting the number of bites taken in a day. People following the diet will limit the number of bites they take to 80 in a day, split between two small meals and two medium-sized meal. The goal is that the dieter will learn to pay more attention to how much they eat and that their body will adjust to eating less. This diet differs from Dr. Black's diet in that it aims solely to reduce the amount of food eaten rather than caloric intake.

== Mechanism of action ==
Dr. Black's bite-counting diet used bites as a proxy for calories, aiming to limit caloric intake by limiting bites. Breibart and Luce, the creators of the 80Bites diet, claim that the primary factor in weight-loss is the amount of food eaten and that exercise and caloric intake are secondary. They claim that eating too much causes the stomach to stretch, which in turn causes hunger-regulating hormones, such as leptin and ghrelin, to become unbalanced.

== Efficacy ==
There is some evidence to suggest that counting bites can lead to weight loss. A 2015 study by Brigham Young University, published in Advances in Obesity, Weight Management & Control, found results correlating bite-counting with weight loss. Participants counted the number the bites they took in a day and reduced it by 20-30% over the next month. Of 41 participants who completed the trial, the researchers found that on average they lost 4 pounds over the trial period. Bite-counting may be easier than calorie counting and can provide a more natural measurement of food intake.
