= Kahnotation =

Kahnotation is a tap dance notation developed by Stanley D. Kahn to document and communicate tap dancing steps and routines.

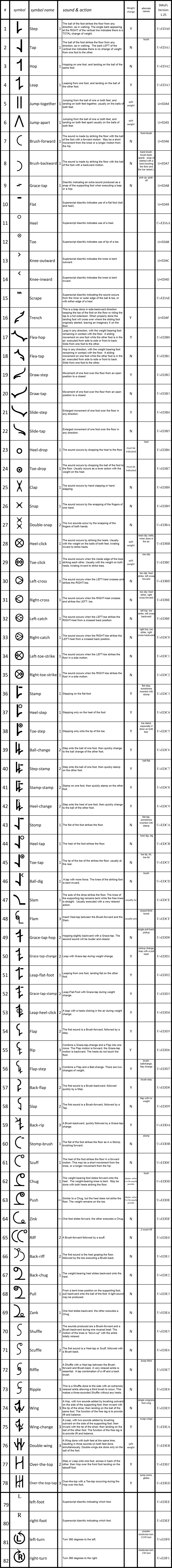
Kahnotation symbols

== History ==
Kahnotation was developed from 1930-1950 by Stanley D. Kahn. A prominent figure of the International Tap Association, he instructed tap dance at his San Francisco studio for 45 years, and was dance director for the Ice Follies (now Disney on Ice). Kahnotation was first published in 1951, with continuing refinements until his death in 1995. Kahnotation is one of the oldest dance notations in use.

In 2016, Kahnotation symbols were proposed as a percussion instrument notation to the W3C Music Notation Community Group. It was adopted in 2018 as part of the Standard Music Font Layout (SMuFL).

== Structure of the Notation ==
The notation consists of 82 symbols. Approximately 30 are primary symbols and the remainder are compound derivatives.

There is no attempt to indicate style, expression, or any of the other dance nuances. These are left entirely to the discretion of the performer or teacher.

The primary symbols define

- Weight change
- Movement of feet (step, tap, brush, shuffle, jump, hop, chug, slide)
- Diacritics (heel, ball, toe, edge)
- Hand sounds (clapping & snapping)

=== Primary concept ===
Weight transference during dance is a key dynamic of balance that must be accurately notated. The primary design concept consists of a vertical or horizontal "stroke" or "shaft", and a barb on either side of the shaft indicating whether a weight change occurs.

When the barb appears at the LEFT of the vertical shaft, there is NO change of weight from one foot to the other. When the barb appears at the RIGHT of the vertical shaft, there is a TOTAL change of weight. This group of symbols define STEPS, TAPS, JUMPS, LEAPS, HOPS, and SLIDES.

=== Brush ===
The second symbol group use C-shaped symbols indicating the foot brushing the floor over a period of time to produce sound. A brush does not change weight. This group of symbols define SHUFFLES, CHUGS, FORWARD BRUSHES, and BACKWARD BRUSHES.

=== Diacritics ===
The diacritics indicate the anatomy of the foot involved, dance rotation, and which foot is involved. For example, when combined with a STEP symbol, they can indicate whether the step is on the toe, heel, or flat footed.

=== Miscellaneous ===
The miscellaneous group of symbols indicate hand clapping, finger snapping, and sounds of feet contacting such as heel drops and toe-clicks, grace taps, etc.
