= Land Information and Management System =

Pakistani Government Program

Land Information and Management System (LIMS)
- Type: Government Initiative
- Legal status: Active
- Purpose: Enhance modern agro-farming, food security, agricultural exports
- Headquarters: Islamabad, Pakistan
- Region served: Pakistan
- Official language: English, Urdu
- Director general: Maj Gen Muhammad Ayub Ahsan Bhatti
- Inaugurated by: Prime Minister Shehbaz Sharif and Chief of Army Staff (COAS) General Asim Munir
- Website: www.limspakistan.com

The Land Information and Management System (LIMS) is a system introduced in Pakistan to improve contemporary agricultural practices. The former Prime Minister, Shehbaz Sharif and Chief of Army Staff (COAS) General Asim Munir, inaugurated the system. Headed by Maj Gen Muhammad Ayub Ahsan Bhatti, its goal is to boost the agriculture sector, which accounts for nearly 25% of the country's GDP.

LIMS is based on a geographic information system (GIS), and aims to streamline the digitization of farming processes. It gives farmers online access to data on climate shifts, satellite-based crop monitoring, water usage, fertilizer application, and targeted spray zones. Its developers believe that LIMS will create jobs for the youth and rejuvenate unused and underutilized land.

== Background ==
LIMS offers real-time updates to farmers regarding soil conditions, crops, weather, water availability, and pest monitoring using remote sensing and geospatial technologies. Additionally, the system is designed to reduce the reliance on intermediaries through an effective marketing framework.

LIMS has main goals centered around bolstering food security, advancing agricultural exports, and alleviating the financial burden caused by imports on the nation's treasury. It is designed to convert underutilized or low-yield land within the country, and reduce food insecurity, malnutrition, and the escalating costs associated with agricultural imports.

== Collaborations ==
LIMS collaborates with several countries including Saudi Arabia, the United Arab Emirates, Qatar, Bahrain, and China for multiple agricultural ventures aimed at boosting Pakistan's exports. In 2023, Saudi Arabia made a $500 million investment to establish the facility.
