= Joan Breibart =

American fitness instructor

- Born: 1941 (age 84–85)
- Education: Barnard College
- Occupation: Pilates instructor
- Years active: 1960s-present
- Known for: PhysicalMind Institute
- Notable work: Diet Directives (2000); Standing Pilates (2004)
- Website: www.physicalmindinstitute.com

Joan Breibart (born 1941) is an American Pilates instructor, inventor, and writer. She is known for establishing the PhysicalMind Institute, formerly known as the Institute for Pilates Method.

== Early life and education ==
Breibart was born in 1941. She graduated from Barnard College in 1963. Upon graduating, she worked in the publishing industry.

== Career ==
Breibart started practicing Pilates during the 1960s. She co-authored the Macmillan textbook Introductory Marketing: A Programmed Approach (1971). In 1987, she moved from New York to Santa Fe, New Mexico following the 1987 stock market crash.

In 1991, she co-founded the Institute for Pilates Method in Santa Fe, New Mexico, now known as the PhysicalMind Institute, with Eve Gentry and Michele Larsson. Before becoming the president of the Institute for the Pilates Method, she worked with Seligman & Latz, a beauty salon chain.

More recently, Breibart invented the Tye4 and Tye4x Pilates Wearable Reformer and currently heads the PhysicalMind Institute. She also holds patents for the Mini-Reformer, the Mve Chair, Parasetter, HeadFloater, SmartSEAT, and other fitness equipment.

== Publications ==
Breibart has authored several books, including Standing Pilates (2004), The Body Biz (2006), and Suckered Into Wellness (2017). She is also the co-author of the Macmillan textbook Introductory Marketing: A Programmed Approach (1971).

- Diet Directives (2000) (with Meredith Luce)
- Standing Pilates: Strengthen and Tone Your Body Wherever You Are (2004). ISBN 978-0-471-56655-7.
- The Body Biz: The Pilates Story (2006)
- Suckered Into Wellness: The Truth Will Set You & Your Body Free (2017)
- 80Bites: The Real Portion Plan, The Real Science of Hormones (2021)
