= Motif description =

Motif description is the term that has been used for a form of dance notation; however, the current preferred terminology is Motif Notation. It is a subset and reconception of Labanotation sharing a common lexis. The main difference between the two forms is the type of information they record.

- Labanotation: Detailed description of movement so it may be reproduced exactly as it was performed or conceived.
- Motif description: Depicts the most important elements, the essential aspects of the movement sequence.

Motif description is often used as an alternative to Labanotation when information needs to be written down quickly.

== See also ==
- Labanotation
- Rudolf Laban
- Dance score
- Dance Notation Bureau
