= Dance notation =

Transcription systems for documenting dance

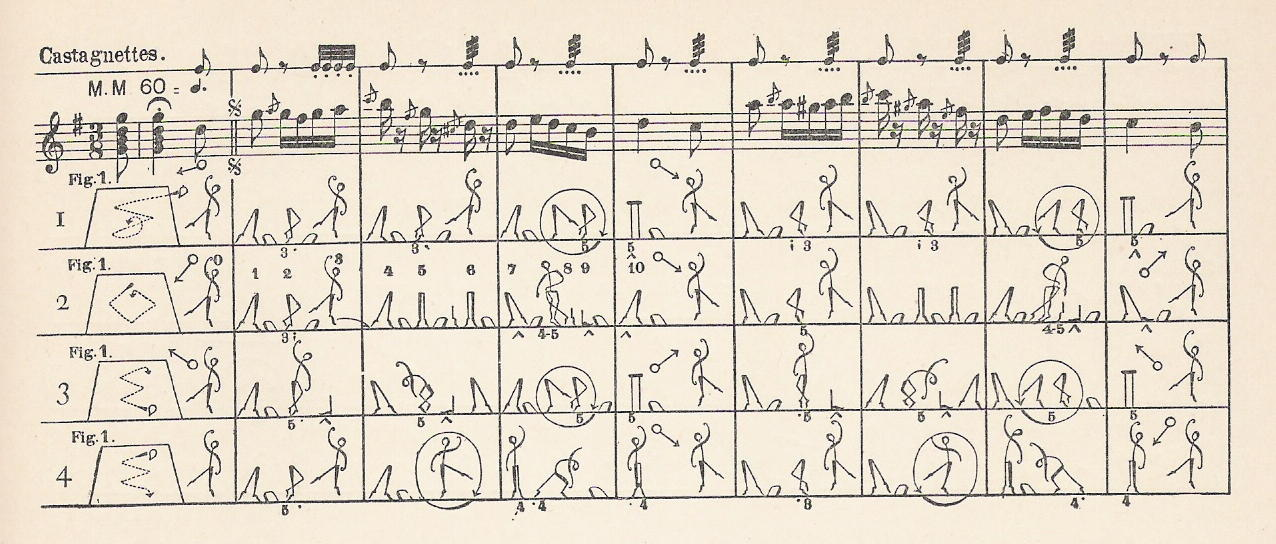
La Cachucha, by Friedrich Albert Zorn using Zorn Notation

Dance notation is the symbolic representation of human dance movement and form, using methods such as graphic symbols and figures, path mapping, numerical systems, and letter and word notations. Several dance notation systems have been invented, many of which are designed to document specific types of dance while others have been developed with capturing the broader spectrum of human movement potential. A dance score is a recorded dance notation that describes a particular dance.

== Usage ==
The primary uses of dance notation are historical dance preservation through documentation and analysis (e.g., in ethnochoreology) or reconstruction of choreography, dance forms, and technical exercises. Dance notation systems also allow for dance works to be documented and therefore potentially copyrighted.

Two popular dance notation systems used in Western culture are Labanotation (also known as Kinetography Laban) and Benesh Movement Notation. Others include Eshkol-Wachman Movement Notation and DanceWriting.

Many dance notation systems are designed for specific types of dance. Some examples include Shorthand Dance Notation for dances from Israel, Morris Dance Notation for Morris dance, and Beauchamp–Feuillet Notation for Baroque dance. As a result, these systems usually cannot effectively describe other types of dance.

== History ==
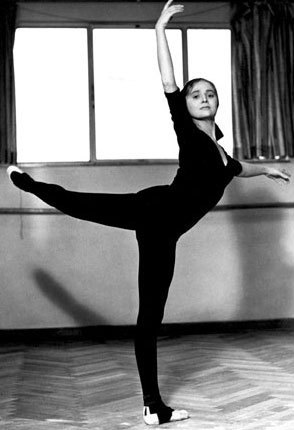
Valerie Sutton in a dance pose...

...and its corresponding "Sutton DanceWriting" notation

In the 1680s, Pierre Beauchamp invented a dance notation system for Baroque dance. His system, known as Beauchamp–Feuillet notation, was published in 1700 by Raoul Auger Feuillet and used to record dances throughout the eighteenth century.

A well-known collection of dance scores is the Sergeyev Collection, recorded using Vladimir Ivanovich Stepanov's notation method (1892). This collection documents the Imperial Ballet's (today the Kirov/Mariinsky Ballet) repertoire from the turn of the 20th century, including Marius Petipa's original choreographic designs for The Sleeping Beauty, Giselle, Le Corsaire, and Swan Lake, as well as Coppélia and the original version of The Nutcracker. It was with this collection that many of these works were first staged outside Russia.

In 1934, the composer Joseph Schillinger created a highly accurate notation system based on the 3D bone rotation and translation of a moving dancer. With motion capture technology half a century in the future, there was no way to effectively measure and record this information at the time.

In 1948, Hanya Holm became the first Broadway choreographer to have her dance scores copyrighted, for her work on Kiss Me, Kate.

In 1951, Stanley D. Kahn published Kahnotation, a dance notation system specific to tap dance.

In 1956, Rudolf and Joan Benesh first published Benesh Movement Notation, a written system for recording human movement. It is most widely used in the recording and restaging of dance works.

In 1958, Eshkol and Wachman published an exposition of their movement notation.

In 1969, Romanian choreographer Theodor Vasilescu published a dance notation system for Romanian folk dances.

In the 1970s, North Korean choreographer U Chang-sop developed a system of dance notation for Korean dance called the Chamo System of Dance Notation, which uses pictorially based symbols.

In 1975, Ann Hutchinson Guest reconstructed choreographer Arthur Saint-Léon's Pas de Six from his 1844 ballet La Vivandière, along with its original music by composer Cesare Pugni, for the Joffrey Ballet. The piece was reconstructed from Saint-Léon's work, which was documented using his own method of dance notation, known as La Sténochorégraphie.

In 1982, the first computerized notation system—the DOM (Dance on Microprocessor) dance notation system—was created by Eddie Dombrower for Apple II computers. The system displayed an animated figure on the screen that performed dance moves specified by the choreographer.

In 2017, Felipe Hsieh created Tango Notation, a dance notation system specific to Argentine tango.

== See also ==
- Action stroke dance notation
- Motif description, a subset of Labanotation
