= Space Harmony =

Rudolf Laban created a movement theory and practice that reflected what he recognized as Space Harmony. The practice/theory is based on universal patterns of nature and of man as part of a universal design/order and was named by Laban: Space Harmony or Choreutics.

Laban, who laid the foundation for Laban Movement Analysis, was interested in the series of natural sequences of movements that we follow in our various everyday activity. Being a dancer/choreographer, he saw the everyday patterns of human action and abstracted the essence of these into the “art of movement”. He saw spatial patterns in human movement and recognized the shapes of the Platonic Solids within these patterns. He applied the ideal patterns of the Platonic Solids as forms to the actualized movement of humans – aligning with and closely approximating the space of these forms. Linking the directions of the vertices of a shape, following the natural spatial pulls to move along all directions within this shape, he came to specific movement Scales: patterned movement sequences that can be repeated, in which one moves through a Platonic Solid in a predefined way.
Moving these Scales opens up the body in space, enlarges spatial awareness and at the same time balances the body spatially. This is why his space theory is called Space Harmony.

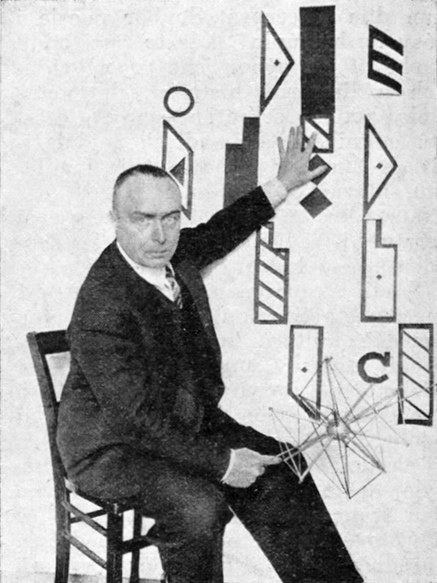
Rudolf Laban showing direction symbols

== History ==
See Rudolf Laban

== Related terms ==
=== General space ===
General space is the space in which we move. It is the actual space or environment, like the room we are in or the street.

=== Kinesphere ===
The personal space or Kinesphere is the space around us within reaching possibilities of the limbs without changing one's place. We can use a large area around us (Far Reach Kinesphere) when we use big movements, especially with our limbs. Or we can use a small area (Near Reach Kinesphere) when we move only within near reach of ourselves. In between is called Mid Reach Kinesphere.

=== Levels ===
Laban believed there were three 'types' of dancers (or movers generally). Those who enjoy moving in the High Level, such as leaping and springing off the ground. Those who enjoy moving in the Central (Middle) Level, their bodies leading with more sensuous movement. And those who enjoy moving in the Deep (Low) Level [...], who prefer more earth-bound movements.

=== Pathways ===
A Pathway refers to the path that is being followed by the movement from one point in space to another. Within the Kinesphere, different approaches to the Pathways of the movement are defined:

- Central Pathway - Movement which is initiated from or passes through the center of the body.
- Peripheral Pathway - Movement along the outer limits of the Kinesphere.
- Transverse Pathway - Movement passing between the center of the body and the periphery of the Kinesphere.

=== Directions ===
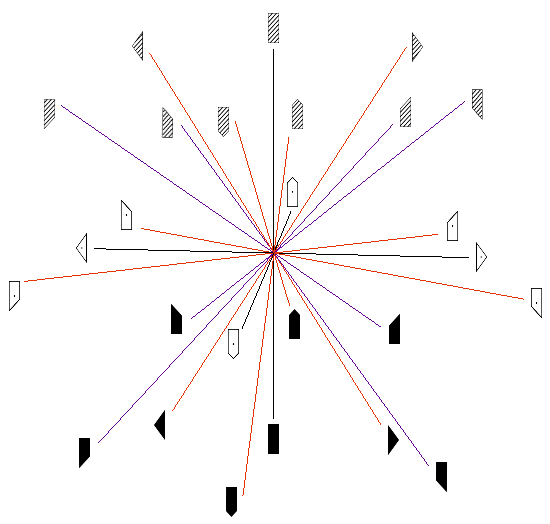
Laban's 26 Direction Symbols

Laban has found a system to define the directions we can move in. This system includes 3 different levels as well as one-, two- and three-dimensional directions. The 26 directions that are in the system, are derived from the vertices of the Octahedron, the Icosahedron and the Cube.

Laban has created symbols for all the directions that he defined in this system. These symbols can be used as a notation system, like in Labanotation, to describe where a person is moving (to) in space.

Although often is being spoken of 'moving to a point in space', Laban explicitly did not see movement as 'moving from point to point', or change from position to position. "Over... ten years [1917-1927], the problem he tried to solve was how to write motion, not only positions passed through, a task which proved to be extraordinarily difficult. All his various solutions up until 1927 - and there are many recorded in Laban's book Choreographie - retain this hope."

In his book Choreutics (1966) he writes: "The future development of kinetography must include the possibility of recording forms in free space ... the conception of a notation capable of doing this is an old dream in this field of research."

=== Inclinations ===
One of the unique aspects of Laban's conception of space has become known as Inclinations.

An inclination is conceived to be either "a diagonal deflected through a close-by dimensional, or alternatively, a dimensional deflected through one of the closest diagonals" and since these two conceptions are essentially identical, Laban related the inclinations to the three dimensions as they are more familiar.

Therefore, three types of inclinations are distinguished:

- Flat inclinations are diagonals deflected by the side-side dimension (horizontal or lateral).
- Steep inclinations are diagonals deflected by the up-down dimension (vertical).
- Suspended inclinations are diagonals deflected by the front-back dimension (sagittal).

== Dynamics in space ==
=== One-dimensional space ===
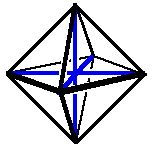
Three dimensions in an octahedral scaffolding

The Dimensions are defined as single spatial pulls with two polar ends. They are the 3 perpendicular axes crossing in the middle. The 3 different Dimensions are:

- Vertical Dimension (up-down)
- Horizontal Dimension (side-side)
- Sagittal Dimension (front-back)

The crossing point is in the center of gravity of the body (Place Middle). The Platonic solid that is defined by the dimensional cross is the Octahedron.

Laban devised movement scales that follow these three dimensions, called the Dimensional Scales.

=== Two dimensional space ===
Icosahedron with planes

Two spatial pulls combined, produce planes in space as well as in the body. The combination of the horizontal and vertical dimensions result in what is called the vertical, or door plane. This plane is also called the plane of presentation.
The combination of the horizontal and the sagittal dimensions result in the horizontal, or table plane. It is also known as the plane of communication.
The third plane is the combination of the vertical and the sagittal dimensions and is called the sagittal, or wheel plane. It is also called the plane of operations.

The Diameters are the lines that connect the opposite corners of the planes. Each plane has 2 diameters, crossing in the middle. The diameters of the planes each consist of 2 unequal spatial pulls.

When putting the planes together, all diameters cross again in the center of gravity of the body. Connecting the corners of the planes with each other leads to the Icosahedron.

Laban thought of many ways to order the movements through the Icosahedron, each with its own character and dynamics. Examples of these scales are: Primary Scale, Axis Scales, Girdle Scales, A and B Scales.

=== Three-dimensional space ===
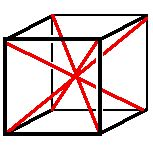
Four diagonals in a cubic scaffolding

Combinations of three dimensions, or spatial pulls, become diagonals; extremes of far reach space that crisscross the body's center from one corner of an imaginary Cube to the opposite corner. Laban devised the Diagonal Scale to explore these extremes of personal space.

An animated stickfigure executing the Diagonal Scales, one of the Scales that are part of Space Harmony of Laban Movement Analysis

Scales animated: To watch animations of the scales, go to Laban Scales

== Scales ==
Analogous to a Musical scale, each choreutic scale (or space harmony scale) systematically encompasses particular ranges of space.

Choreutic scales can also be compared to mathematical puzzles such as Leonhard Euler and his problem of the Seven Bridges of Königsberg, as well as William Rowan Hamilton and his Icosian game. Choreutic scales present symmetric solutions to these types of puzzles accomplished within the movement space of the human body.

Most Choreutic scales follow regular sequential patterns, similar to these puzzles:

- They form a complete ring (circuit), ending at the same place where they began.
- They consist of a series of lines, all of the same type (for example, all transverse or all peripheral) or of regular repetitions (one central line followed by one peripheral line, etc.).
- When the scale is related to a polyhedron, they might use every vertex once, and only once, or use every edge (line) once and only once, before completing the circuit.
- They are structured with three-dimensional symmetry (rotational symmetry and reflection symmetry).

=== Scales in the icosahedron ===
Laban developed many scales within the Icosahedron, some of them with Transverse Movement, like the Axis and A- and B-Scales, others with Peripheral Movement, like the Girdle and Primary Scales.

In the scales with Transverse Movement, one moves from a Direction in one plane through the second plane towards a Direction in the third plane, following the natural Spatial Pull of the missing Dimension.

E.g.: when one starts a movement scale in the Right High Direction, one is in the Vertical Plane. This plane exists of the combination of the Vertical Dimension and the Horizontal Dimension. When reaching to the Right High Direction, the natural way to balance the body is to move towards the 'missing' Sagittal Dimension, so in this case going forward or backward.

To accomplish the task of going from the one plane (in this case Vertical) through another plane towards the third, one can only cross the Horizontal Plane and thus move towards either the Front Low or the Back Low Direction in the Sagittal Plane.

Note that the pathway of the movement in this example is a Transverse Pathway, because it passes between the center of the body and the periphery of the Kinesphere. Movements that follow the specific definition as described above, Laban called Transversals.

So although moving from the one plane to the other, planes being two dimensional, one moves through all planes and thus through all dimensions during the scale as a whole, following an organic body-organization to stay balanced. Especially the sensation of being led by and leading oneself through all these different spatial directions, adding dimensions and leaving them out again, can give the feeling one flies through space, being pulled back and taking off again.

=== Trefoil knot ===
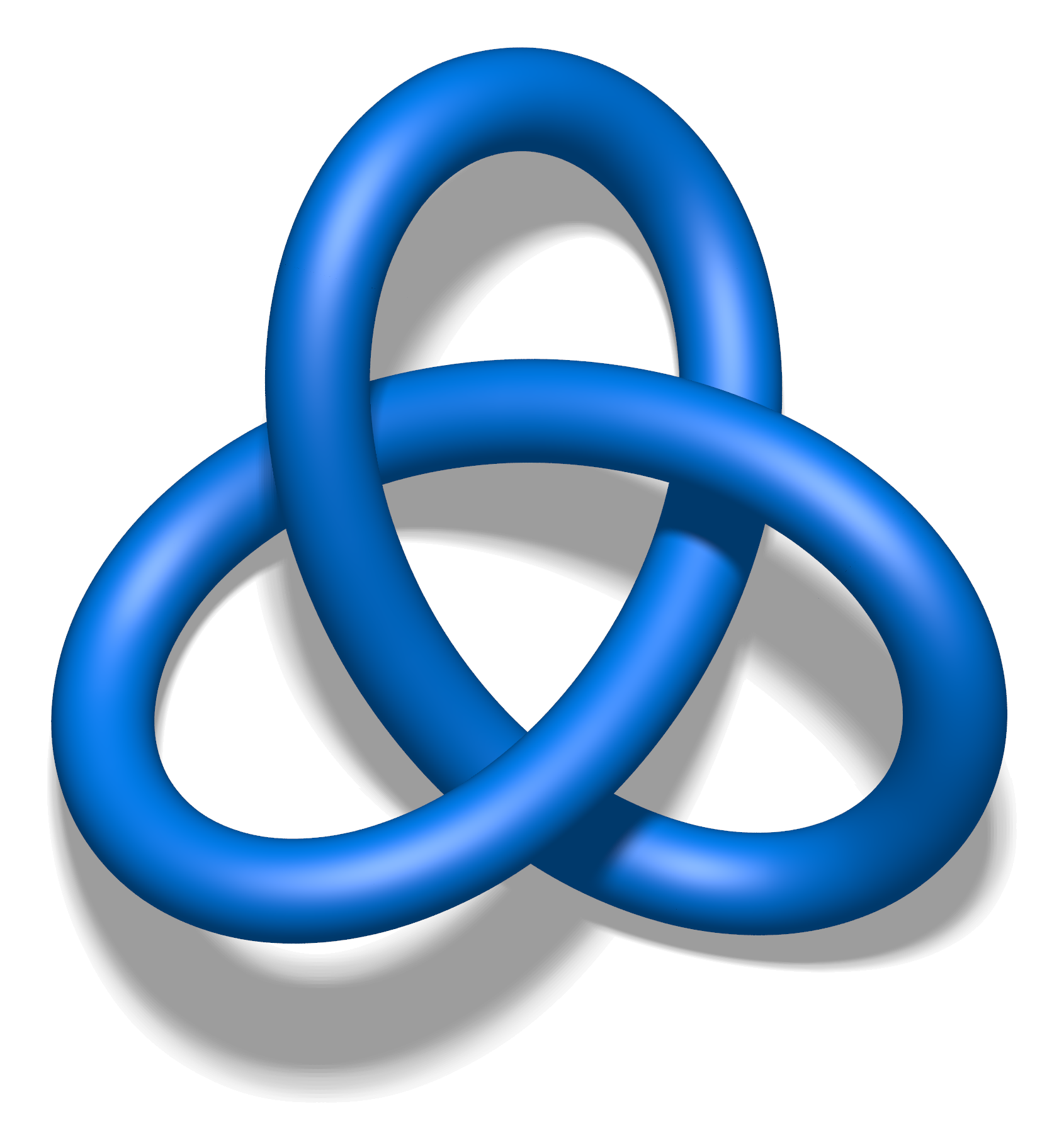
Blue Trefoil Knot

The patterns of many scales can be found to be based on the Trefoil knot. This is used to represent the spatial model of the "standard scale of the dynamosphere" and appears several times in Laban's unpublished manuscripts, referred to as a "9-part knot", aligned with a 9-part ring following edges of three planes inside an icosahedron, and also located along six edges of an octahedron, creating a version of the dimensional scale.
