= Dance Notation Bureau =

The Dance Notation Bureau (DNB) is a non-profit organization founded to preserve choreographic works through notating dance scores in Labanotation and collaborating with dance companies to stage reconstructions of those works. Based in New York City, DNB was founded by Helen Priest Rogers, Eve Gentry, Janey Price, and Ann Hutchinson in 1940. It has significant holdings of videotapes, photographs, programs, and production information. Its mission is to advance the art of dance through the use of a system of notation called Labanotation. This allows the dances to continue to be performed long after the lifetime of the artist.

In August 2007 it recommenced active work on the notation of dance works following a hiatus since October 2005. The DNB is both privately and publicly funded, including the National Endowment for the Arts and the New York State Council on the Arts and has a $500,000 endowment.

DNB assists about 150 performances each year, including 20 under license from the choreographer or their heirs.

The DNB's Extension for Education and Research is at the Ohio State University.

== Online Resources ==
The DNB released an online catalog of its Notated Theatrical Dances Collection, including works by George Balanchine, Paul Taylor, Antony Tudor, Bill T. Jones, Doris Humphrey, William Forsythe, José Limón and Laura Dean. In addition, the DNB is digitizing its Moving Images Collection as the supplement to the Notated Theatrical Dances Catalog. These clips are available at YouTube site.
