= Labanotation =

System for analyzing and recording human movement

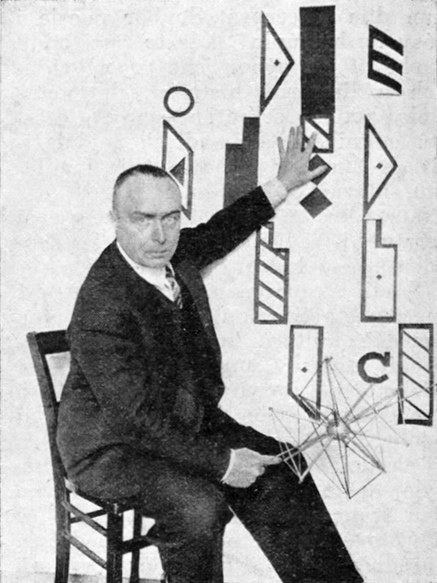
Rudolf Laban presenting his notation system, circa 1929

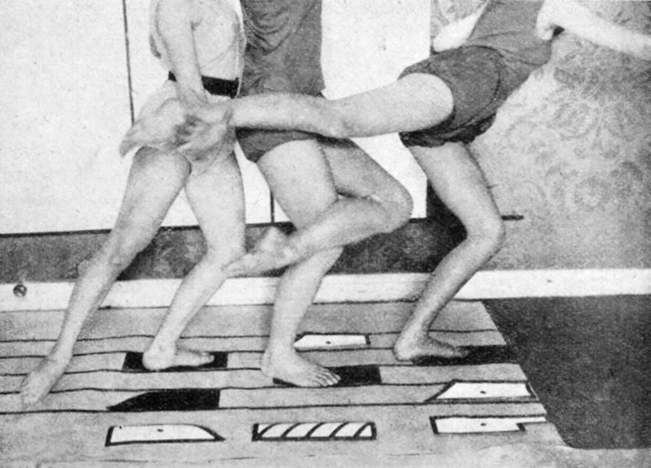
Dance workshop based on Laban's notation system, circa 1929

Labanotation (grammatically correct form "Labannotation" or "Laban notation" is uncommon) is a system for analyzing and recording human movement (notation system), invented by Austro-Hungarian choreographer and dancer Rudolf von Laban (1879–1958, a central figure in European modern dance), who developed his notation on movements in the 1920s.

== History ==
Laban's first book on the subject was published in German in 1928 called Schrifttanz (Written Dance); a similar version in French and English appeared in 1930. A few years later Laban's interest turned to other matters and he gave his notation system to the world. The German dancer, choreographer and pedagogue Albrecht Knust, who by 1930 had together with Laban's daughter Azra (Azraela) established the Tanz-Schreib-Stube (the first Dance Notation Bureau), was the first-ever full-time kinetographer-movement notator. Between 1946 and 1950 Knust wrote his major work Das Handbuch der Kinetographie Laban (The Manual of Kinetography Laban) in eight-volumes in German, typed carbon copies appeared in 1951 in English. Ann Hutchinson Guest and former student of Sigurd Leeder, studied the system differences among and between the various practitioners taught by former Laban student Irma Betz, and had the opportunity to confer with Laban, Knust and Leeder personally on movement details and ideas, developed it further naming it Labanotation. The two systems differ somewhat.

Laban's notation system's other applications include Laban Movement Analysis, robotics and human movement simulation. With Labanotation, any form of human movement can be recorded: The basis is natural human movement, every change must be noted.

This notation system could be used to describe movement in terms of spatial models and concepts, which contrasts with other movement notation systems based on anatomical analysis, letter codes, stick figures, music notes, track systems, or word notes. The system precisely and accurately portrays temporal patterns, actions, floor plans, body parts and a three-dimensional use of space. Laban's notation system eventually evolved into modern-day Labanotation and Kinetography Laban.

Labanotation and Kinetography Laban evolved separately in the 1930s through 1950s, in the United States and England, and Germany and other European countries respectively. As a result of their different evolutionary paths, Kinetography Laban remained consistent since its inception, whereas Labanotation evolved over time to meet new needs. For example, at the behest of members of the Dance Notation Bureau, the Labanotation system was expanded to allow it to convey the motivation or meaning behind movements. Kinetography Laban practitioners, on the other hand, tend to work within the constraints of the existing notation system, using spatial description alone to describe movement.

The International Council of Kinetography Laban was created in 1959 to clarify, standardize and eliminate differences between Labanotation and Kinetography Laban. As a result, one or both are currently used throughout the world almost interchangeably, and are readable to practitioners of either system.

== Main concepts ==
Labanotation uses abstract symbols to define the:

- Direction and level of the movement
- Part of the body doing the movement
- Duration of the movement
- Dynamic quality of the movement

=== Direction and level of the movement ===
The shapes of the direction symbols indicate nine different directions in space and the shading of the symbol specifies the level of the movement.

Each "direction symbol" indicates the orientation of a line between the proximal and distal points of a body part or a limb. That is, "the direction signs indicate the direction towards which the limbs must incline".

The direction symbols are organized as three levels: high, middle, and low (or deep):

Labanotation direction symbols
(Hover mouse over symbols to see their names)
| High Level | forward-left-high | forward-high | forward-right-high | left-forward-high | forward-high | right-forward-high |
| High Level | left-high | place-high | right-high | left-high | place-high | right-high |
| High Level | backward-left-high | backward-high | backward-right-high | left-back-high | back-high | right-back-high |
| Middle Level | left-forward-middle | forward-middle | right-forward-middle | left-forward-middle | forward-middle | right-forward-middle |
| Middle Level | left-middle | place-middle | right-middle | left-middle | place-middle | right-middle |
| Middle Level | left-back-middle | back-middle | right-back-middle | left-back-middle | back-middle | right-back-middle |
| Low Level | forward-left-deep | forward-low | forward-right-deep | left-forward-Low | forward-Low | right-forward-Low |
| Low Level | left-deep | place-low | right-deep | left-Low | place-Low | right-Low |
| Low Level | backward-left-deep | backward-deep | backward-right-deep | left-back-Low | back-Low | right-back-Low |

=== Part of the body doing the movement ===
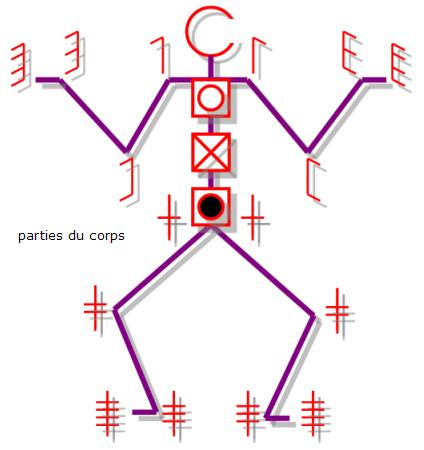
Signs for parts of the body

Labanotation is a record of a factual framework of movement, so that it can be reproduced.

The symbols are placed on a vertical staff, the horizontal dimension of the staff represents the symmetry of the body, and the vertical dimension represents time passing by.

The location of a symbol on the staff defines the body part it represents. The centre line of the staff represents the centre line of the body, symbols on the right represent the right side of the body, symbols on the left, the left side.

=== Duration of the movement ===
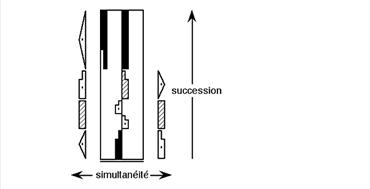
Simultaneous movement and sequence of motions

The staff is read from bottom to top and the length of a symbol defines the duration of the movement. Drawing on western music notation, Labanotation uses bar lines to mark the measures and double bar lines at the start and end of the movement score. The starting position of the dancer can be given before the double bar lines at the start of the score.

Movement is indicated as "the transition from one point to the next", that is as one "directional destination" to the next.

Spatial distance, spatial relationships, transference of weight, centre of weight, turns, body parts, paths, and floor plans can all be notated by specific symbols. Jumps are indicated by an absence of any symbol in the support column, indicating that no part of the body is touching the floor.

=== Dynamic quality of the movement ===
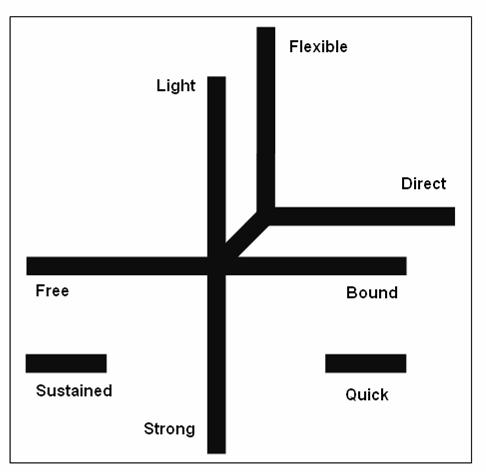
Laban effort graph

The dynamic quality is often indicated through the use of effort signs (see Laban Movement Analysis).

The four effort categories are

- Flow: Direct / Indirect
- Weight: Strong / Light
- Time: Sudden / Sustained
- Space: Bound / Free

Dynamics in Labanotation are also indicated through a set of symbols indicating a rise or lowering of energy resulting from physical or emotional motive, e.g. physically forceful versus an intense emotional state.

=== Motif notation ===
Motif description, or the preferred term 'Motif notation', is closely related to Labanotation in its use of the same family of symbols and terminology. Labanotation is used for a literal, detailed description of movement so it can be reproduced as it was created or performed. In contrast, Motif Notation highlights core elements and leitmotifs depicting the overall structure or essential elements of a movement sequence. It can be used to set a structure for dance improvisation or for an educational exploration of movement concepts. Not limited to dance, Motif Notation can be used to direct one's focus when learning to swing a golf club, the primary features of a character in a play, or the intent of a person's movement in a therapy session.
