= Piscator (disambiguation) =

Erwin Piscator was a German theatre director and producer.

Piscator may also refer to:

- Piscator (surname)
- Piscator (bird), a genus of extinct cormorant-like birds
- Piscator (Paolozzi), a sculpture by Eduardo Paolozzi at Euston Station, London
- the Chequered Keelback (Fowlea piscator)
- the Red-footed Booby (Sula piscator)
- the Western Plantain-eater (Crinifer piscator)
