= Piscator (surname) =

The surname Piscator may refer to:

- Erwin Piscator (1893–1966), German theatre director
- Maria Ley-Piscator (1898–1999), Austrian dancer and choreographer
- Johannes Piscator (1546–1625), German theologian and instructor
- Nicolas Joannes Piscator (1587 – 1652), Latinized name of Claes Janszoon Visscher, Dutch Golden Age draughtsman, engraver, mapmaker and publisher.
