= Deirdre O'Connell =

Irish American actress, singer, and theatre director (1939 – 2001)

- Born: Eleanore Deirdre O'Connell; 16 June 1939; South Bronx, New York, United States
- Died: 9 June 2001 (aged 61); Dublin, Ireland
- Other names: Actress, singer, theatre director
- Spouse: Luke Kelly (1965–1970s)

Eleanore Deirdre O'Connell (16 June 1939 – 9 June 2001) was an Irish American actress, singer, and theatre director who founded the Focus Theatre in Dublin, Ireland.

== Biography ==
O'Connell was born in the South Bronx district of New York City, one of five children whose parents were Irish immigrants. When she finished school, she pursued her interest in theatre studying first at Erwin Piscator's Dramatic Workshop, New York City, and later at the Actors Studio run by Lee Strasberg. In her early twenties, O'Connell moved to Dublin, Ireland, where she set up the Stanislavski Studio at the Pocket Theatre. There she trained a small company of actors in Stanislavski's system. In 1967, she founded the Focus Theatre, becoming its manager, artistic director, and fundraiser—as well as acting in many of its productions.

She was a noted folk-singer and performed at the Newport Folk Festival. She married the Irish singer Luke Kelly in June 1965, but they separated in the early 1970s.

O'Connell died of cancer at her home in Dublin at the age of 61 and is buried in Glasnevin Cemetery.
