= Dolly, Lotte and Maria =

Dolly, Lotte und Maria
- Directed by: Rosa von Praunheim
- Screenplay by: Rosa von Praunheim
- Produced by: Rosa von Praunheim
- Starring: Dolly Haas; Lotte Goslar; Maria Ley-Piscator
- Cinematography: Jeff Preiss
- Edited by: Mike Shephard; Rosa von Praunheim
- Production companies: Norddeutscher Rundfunk (NDR); Rosa von Praunheim Filmproduktion
- Release date: 16 February 1987
- Running time: 60 minutes
- Country: West Germany
- Language: German

Dolly, Lotte and Maria (German: Dolly, Lotte und Maria) is a 1987 German documentary film directed by Rosa von Praunheim. The film recounts the lives of Lotte Goslar, Dolly Haas and Maria Ley-Piscator, three German women performers who achieved success in Berlin in the 1930s. All left Nazi Germany for reasons of conscience, and eventually settled in the United States. After the war, all three remained in America and continued actively pursuing their careers, with mixed success. Each discusses her beginnings as a performer, her achievements in Europe, the reasons that motivated her to leave Germany, her decision to move to the U.S., and her current activities.

For example, the film was shown at the Museum of Modern Art in New York City in 1988 and at the 1989 San Francisco International Film Festival.

== Plot ==
Portrait of three remarkable women who were once celebrated figures in the German cultural scene: film star Dolly Haas, dancer Lotte Goslar and artist Maria Ley, Erwin Piscator's widow.

== Reception ==
"Von Praunheim (A Virus Knows no Morals) allows his subjects to reveal themselves and their histories through their own words and works — a fitting tribute to lives of integrity and talent." (George Eldred, film critic and program director of the Aspen Shortsfest)
