= Adolf Arndt =

German politician (1904–1974)

- Arndt in 1964

Senator for Science and Art of Berlin
- In office 11 March 1963 – 9 April 1964
- Governing Mayor: Willy Brandt
- Preceded by: Office established
- Succeeded by: Werner Stein

Member of the Bundestag
- In office 7 September 1949 – 20 October 1969
- Preceded by: Constituency established
- Succeeded by: Multi-member district
- Constituency: Hersfeld (1949–1957); Bavaria state list (1957–1961); Berlin state list (1961–1965); North Rhine-Westphalia state list (1965–1969)

Personal details
- Born: Karl Otto Adolf Arndt; 12 March 1904 Königsberg, Germany
- Died: 13 February 1974 (aged 69) Kassel, West Germany
- Party: Social Democratic
- Education: Gymnasium Philippinum; Marburg University; FWU Berlin

Adolf Arndt (12 March 1904 – 13 February 1974) was a German politician of the Social Democratic Party (SPD) and former member of the German Bundestag.

== Early life ==
Born in Königsberg as the son of the law professor Gustav Adolf Arndt, he moved to Berlin very early with his family. There, he passed his Abitur at the Gymnasium Philippinum Marburg. Then, Arndt studied law, economics and philosophy at the University of Berlin and the University of Marburg. After passing his second examination and promotion in Marburg in 1927, he worked as a lawyer in the famous law firm of Max Alsberg. From 1932, he worked as a judge, but retired in 1933, stating he did not want to join the Nazi Party. Thus, he joined the law firm of Fritz Schönberg in Berlin, helping (among others) Wilhelm Leuschner and Theodor Leipart. After being classified as half Jewish, Arndt was forced to compulsory labour in the Organisation Todt.

In August 1945, Arndt was approved as a lawyer and notary in Marburg. In November 1945, he became Ministerialrat (Head of Division) of Criminal law at the Ministry of Justice of Hesse.

== Political career ==
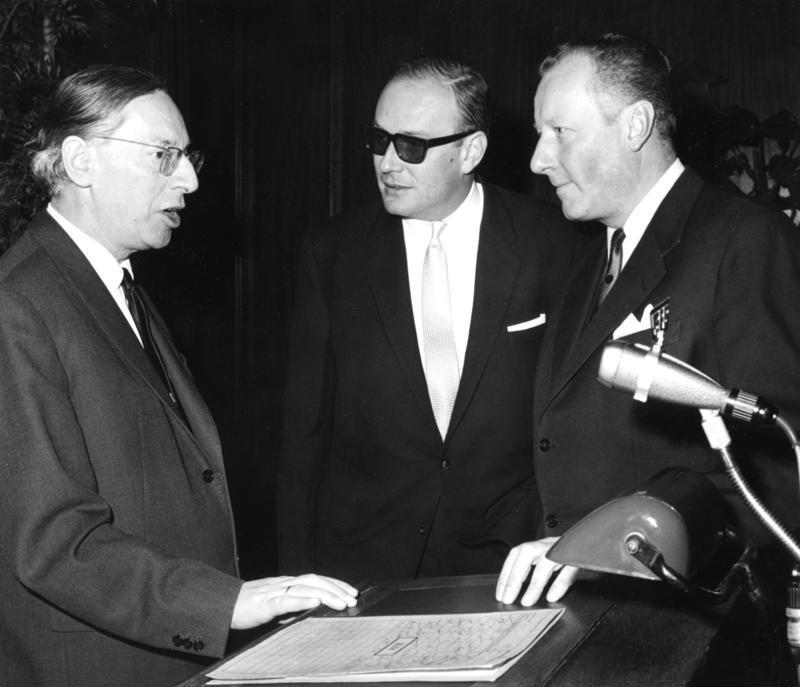
Adolf Arndt (left) with Walter Krüttner and Jürgen Neven-DuMont

Since 1945, Arndt was a member of the SPD. In the 1950s, he was a member of the management and participated in creating the Godesberg Program.

In 1948 and 1949, he was a member of the economic council of the Bizone, chairing the board for law, clerk law and "DM-Eröffnungsbilanz" (statement of the financial conditions for the Deutsche Mark). From 1949 to 1969, Arndt was a member of the Bundestag for the SPD. From 1949–61, he served as corporate attorney and secretary of the SPD faction. In addition to that, he served in 1951/52 as deputy managing director of the Bundestag board for Law and Constitutional law as well as deputy managing director of the Bundestag board for reviewing the federal administration (the so-called Platow-Ausschuss). From 1953 to 1961, he chaired the research group "Rechtswesen" of the SPD faction.

Arndt is most famous for his speech in the debate about statute-barred prosecution of Nazi crimes, in which he states that morally feels guilty about taking part in those crimes.

In many cases, Arndt represented the SPD faction before the Bundesverfassungsgericht.

From 11 March 1963 to 31 March 1964 Arndt served as senator for science and arts in Berlin.

== Personal life ==
Arndt was married to Ruth Arndt (1901–1989), born Helbing. His son is Claus Arndt, a member of the Bundestag from 1968–72 and 1974–76.

Arndt died in Kassel. His estate is at the archive of social democracy of the Friedrich Ebert Foundation.

== Writings ==
- "Warum und wozu Wiedergutmachung?", in: Juristenzeitung, 1956
- Die Persönlichkeit in der parlamentarischen Demokratie, Berlin, 1958
- "Die Entmachtung des Bundestages", in: Die Neue Gesellschaft, 1959
- "Die Nichtigkeit verfassungswidriger Gesetze", in: Die öffentliche Verwaltung
- "Der Jurist im Parlament", in: Juristen-Jahrbuch 1960
- Das nicht erfüllte Grundgesetz, Tübingen, 1960
- "Das zeitgerechte Parlamentsgebäude", in: Die Neue Gesellschaft, 1962
- "Gesetzesrecht und Richterrecht", in: Neue Juristische Wochenschrift, 1963
- "Reform der Parlamentarischen Untersuchungsausschüsse", in: Deutsche Richterzeitung, 1964
- "Opposition", in: Die Neue Sammlung, 1968

== Literature about Arndt ==
- Horst Ehmke, Carlo Schmid, Hans Scharoun (Ed.), Festschrift für Adolf Arndt zum 65. Geburtstag, Frankfurt am Main, 1969.
- Claus Arndt (Ed.): Adolf Arndt zum 90. Geburtstag., Dokumentation der Festakademie in der Katholischen Akademie Hamburg, Kath. Akademie Hamburg und Friedrich-Ebert-Stiftung, 1995
