= Dramatic Workshop =

Dramatic Workshop was the name of a drama and acting school associated with the New School for Social Research in New York City. The German expatriate stage director Erwin Piscator began a long association with the school in 1940. Among the faculty were Lee Strasberg and Stella Adler, among the students Robert De Niro, Marlon Brando, Tony Curtis, Beatrice Arthur, Walter Matthau, Tennessee Williams and Elaine Stritch. The Dramatic Workshop considerably contributed to the resurgence of the Off-Broadway theatre.

== History ==
In the spring of 1939, Alvin Johnson, the president of the New School for Social Research in New York City, signed an agreement with German expatriate stage director Erwin Piscator to found a drama and acting school at The New School in conjunction with American director James Light. Light served as the first dean of the school from 1939-1942. The “Dramatic Workshop” started its operations in January 1940 with some 20 students. In September 1940 the Workshop began to launch semi-professional theatre productions within the “Studio Theatre” (i.e. the Tishman Auditorium) at 66 West 12th Street. In 1944 the Dramatic Workshop began to hold annual summer theatres at summer resort towns such as Sayville and Lake Placid.

After the end of World War II, the G. I. Bill led to a massive student increase at the Dramatic Workshop, "momentarily making it one of the largest dramatic schools in the country." Since the Studio Theatre had to be closed in 1944, Piscator successively started to transfer the student productions to the President Theatre at 247 West 48th Street and the “Rooftop Theatre” at 111 East Houston Street in 1946. In June 1949 the Workshop was separated from The New School.

With Erwin Piscator's return to West-Germany in October 1951 his wife Maria Ley-Piscator took over the school's management. In later years, Ley-Piscator sold the school to the film and theatre agent Saul C. Colin who sustained the “Senior Dramatic Workshop” until his early death in 1967.

Among the students of the Dramatic Workshop were Frank Aletter, Bea Arthur, Harry Belafonte, Vinnette Justine Carroll, Nehemiah Persoff, Woodrow Parfrey, Gene Saks, Harry Guardino, Marlon Brando, Tony Curtis, Jack Garfein, Walter Matthau, Judith Malina, Deirdre O'Connell, Rod Steiger, Elaine Stritch, Jack Creley, and Tennessee Williams. The Dramatic Workshop's faculty included Stella Adler, Theresa Helburn, and Lee Strasberg all of whom taught different acting approaches such as Stanislavski's “system” and Piscator's “objective acting”. Among other theatre schools and companies, the Dramatic Workshop played a vital role in paving the way for Off-Broadway theatre.

Encouraged through a successful Piscator Symposium at the New School for Social Research in 1987, since that year, "the New School has regularly offered 'Dramatic Workshop Two,' often taught by Judith Malina, Piscator's student and co-founder of the Living Theatre". The workshop series was later discontinued.

== Productions (selection) ==
- March 10, 1940 – Saint Joan (author: George Bernard Shaw; Belasco Theatre, Washington, D.C.)
- March 11, 1942 – Nathan the Wise (Gotthold Ephraim Lessing; Studio Theatre und Belasco Theatre, New York)
- May 20, 1942 – War and Peace (Leo Tolstoy, adaptation by Alfred Neumann and Erwin Piscator; Studio Theatre)
- November 28, 1942 – Winter Soldiers (Dan James; Studio Theatre)
- September 4, 1944 – The Last Stop (Irving Kaye Davis; Ethel Barrymore Theatre, New York)
- April 17, 1947 – The Flies (Jean-Paul Sartre; President Theatre, New York)
- January 17, 1948 – All the King's Men (Robert Penn Warren; President Theatre)
- March 1, 1949 – Outside the Door (Wolfgang Borchert; President Theatre)
- September 16, 1949 - The Burning Bush (Géza Herczeg, Heinz Herald; Rooftop Theatre, New York)

== Literature ==
- Thomas George Evans (1968). Piscator in the American Theatre. New York, 1939–1951. University of Wisconsin Press, Ann Arbor.
- Maria Ley-Piscator (1967, ³1979). The Piscator Experiment. The Political Theatre. James H. Heineman, New York.
- Judith Malina (2012). The Piscator Notebook. Routledge Chapman & Hall, London. ISBN 0-415-60073-1.
- Gerhard F. Probst (1991). Erwin Piscator and the American Theatre. Peter Lang, New York, San Francisco, Berne etc.
- Peter M. Rutkoff (1986). Politics on Stage. Piscator and the Dramatic Workshop. In: Peter M. Rutkoff, William B. Scott. New School: a History of the New School for Social Research, pp. 172–195. Macmillan, New York.
- Ilka Saal (2007). Broadway and the Depoliticization of Epic Theatre: The Case of Erwin Piscator. In: J. Chris Westgate (ed.). Brecht. Broadway and United States Theatre, pp. 45–71. Cambridge Scholars, Newcastle.
- Klaus Wannemacher (2018). Moving Theatre Back to the Spotlight: Erwin Piscator’s Later Stage Work. In: David Barnett (ed.). The Great European Stage Directors. Vol. 2. Meyerhold, Piscator, Brecht, pp. 91–129. Bloomsbury (Methuen Drama), London etc. ISBN 1-474-25411-X.
- John Willett (1978). Erwin Piscator: New York and the Dramatic Workshop 1939–1951, pp. 3–16. Performing Arts Journal, Vol. 2, No. 3.

== links ==
- The School of Drama at The New School
- Course catalogs of the Dramatic Workshop of the New School
