= Lotte Goslar =

German-American dancer (1907–1997)

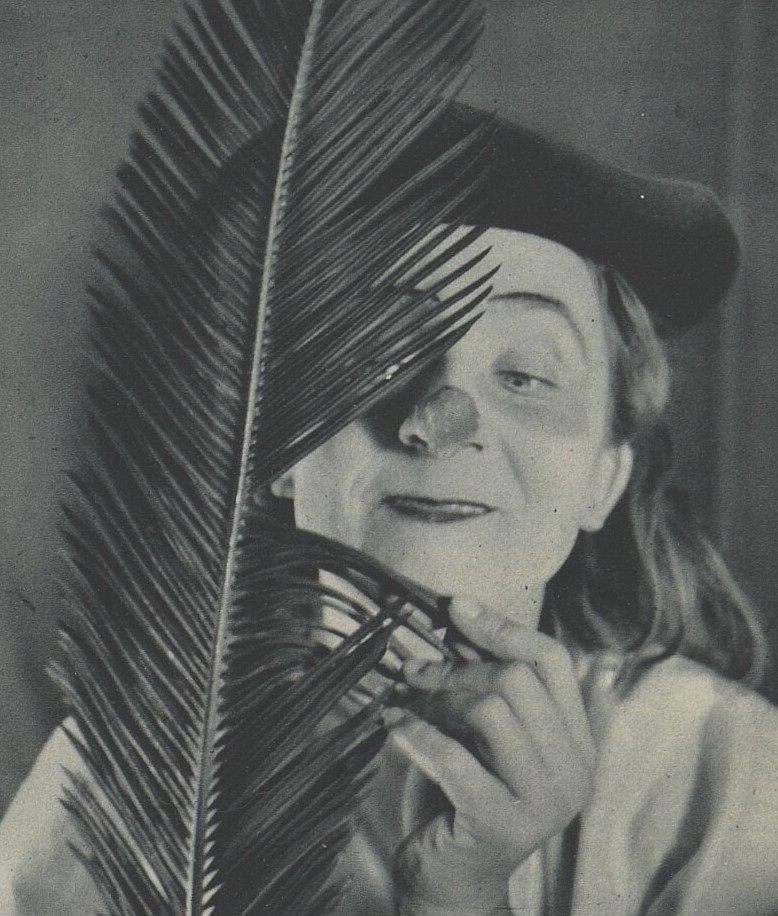
Lotte Goslar, Osvobozené divadlo, Prague 1935

Lotte Goslar (27 February 1907 – 16 October 1997) was a German-American dancer.

== Life ==
Born in Dresden, Goslar came from a banking family and worked towards a career as a dancer from an early age. She took lessons with Mary Wigman and Gret Palucca. She made her debut in Berlin. She soon developed her own style of expressionist dance. In 1933, she left Germany and joined Erika Mann's cabaret Die Pfeffermühle.

She toured Europe with the cabaret and had success at the Free Theatre (Osvobozené divadlo) in Prague. She travelled with the group to the US in late autumn 1936, in order to make a new (but futile) start there with the Peppermill at the beginning of 1937. She remained in exile there out of disgust for the National Socialists.

Goslar performed in nightclubs and went to Hollywood in 1943, where she founded her own troupe with which she undertook many extensive tours of the US and later Europe. Since the late 1970s, she performed repeatedly in Germany.

As choreographer she developed a hybrid form of dance and pantomime. Her titles include For Humans Only (1954) and Clowns and Other Fools (1966). She also worked as a dance instructor, teaching Marilyn Monroe of whom she was one of the few attendees to her funerals on 8 August 1962 and Gower Champion, among others. In 1987, Goslar appeared in Rosa von Praunheim's film Dolly, Lotte and Maria.

She bequeathed her artistic dance estate to the Deutsches Tanzarchiv Köln and the Jerome Robbins Dance Division of the New York Public Library.

Goslar died in Great Barrington, Massachusetts, at the age of 90.
