= Piscator (Paolozzi) =

Sculpture by Eduardo Paolozzi

- Euston Head
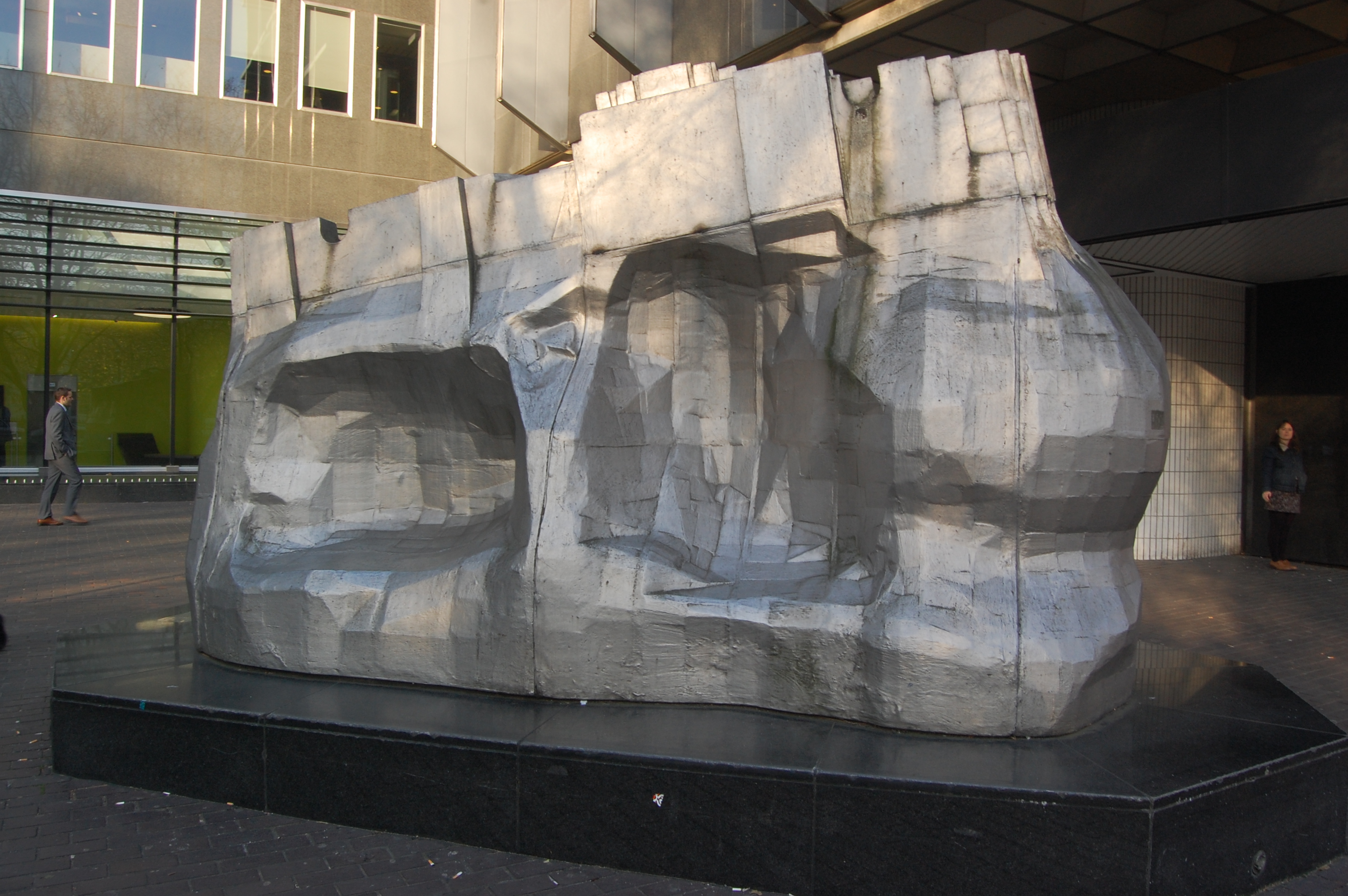
- Piscator

- Artist: Eduardo Paolozzi
- Year: 1980
- Medium: Cast iron with aluminium
- Movement: Abstract
- Dimensions: 3.1 m × 4.6 m × 1.85 m (10 ft × 15 ft × 6.1 ft)
- Location: Euston Station, London
- Coordinates: 51.5271°N 0.1333°W
- Owner: Arts Council of England

Piscator, also known as the Euston Head, is a large abstract sculpture by Eduardo Paolozzi. It was commissioned by British Rail in 1980 for the forecourt of Euston Station in London, and is named for the German theatre director Erwin Piscator.

The sculpture is made from cast iron with an aluminium finish, and was cast by the ironfounders Robert Taylor and Co. It measures 3.1 by 4.6 by 1.85 metres (10.2 ft × 15.1 ft × 6.1 ft). In making the work, Paolozzi was assisted by Ray Watson. The sides of the sculpture have silvered bumps and hollows; viewed from above, the top surface resolves into a blocky human body and face. It is described in Pevsner as "a silvered block with curved hollows, and rectangular shapes above".

In late 2016, it was reported that the ownership of the sculpture was unclear. It was commissioned by British Rail, which was privatised in the 1990s, and the sculpture may have been inherited by Network Rail, who owns the freehold of the land on which it sits. However, Network Rail has denied ownership, saying that the land is leased to Sydney & London Properties, but the leaseholders have also denied any responsibility for the sculpture. It has since been discovered that the Arts Council of England owns the work.

A series of six 4.5 inches (110 mm) models in bronze were also cast, with one held by the Science Museum.

== Gallery ==
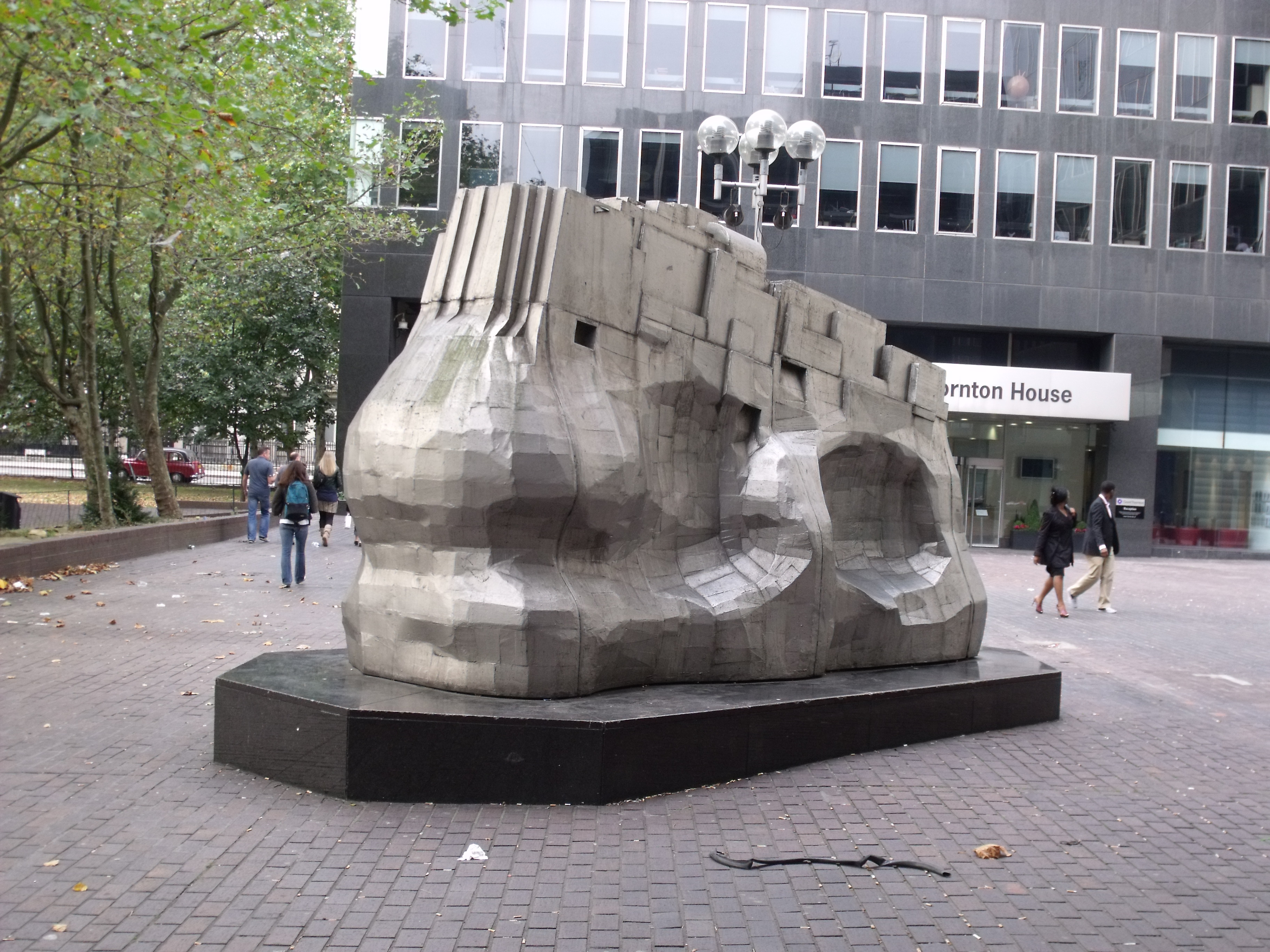

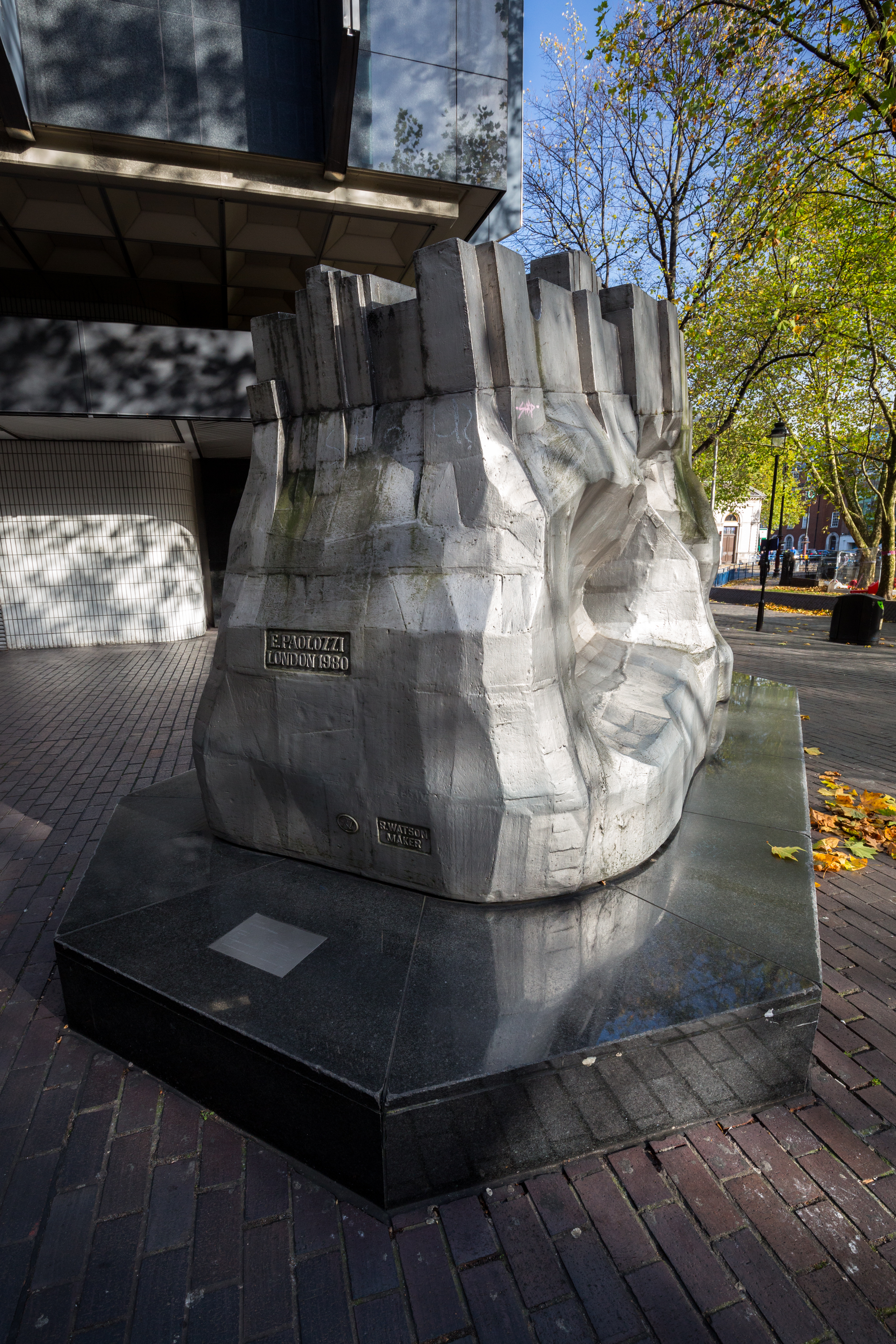
Embossed text "E.PAOLOZZI - LONDON 1980" and "R.WATSON MAKER"

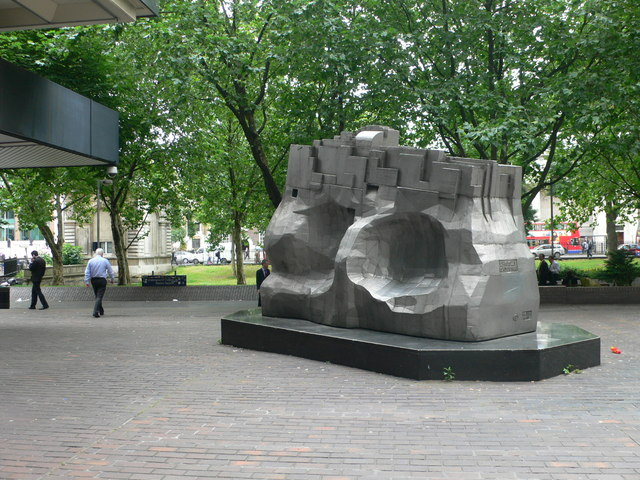

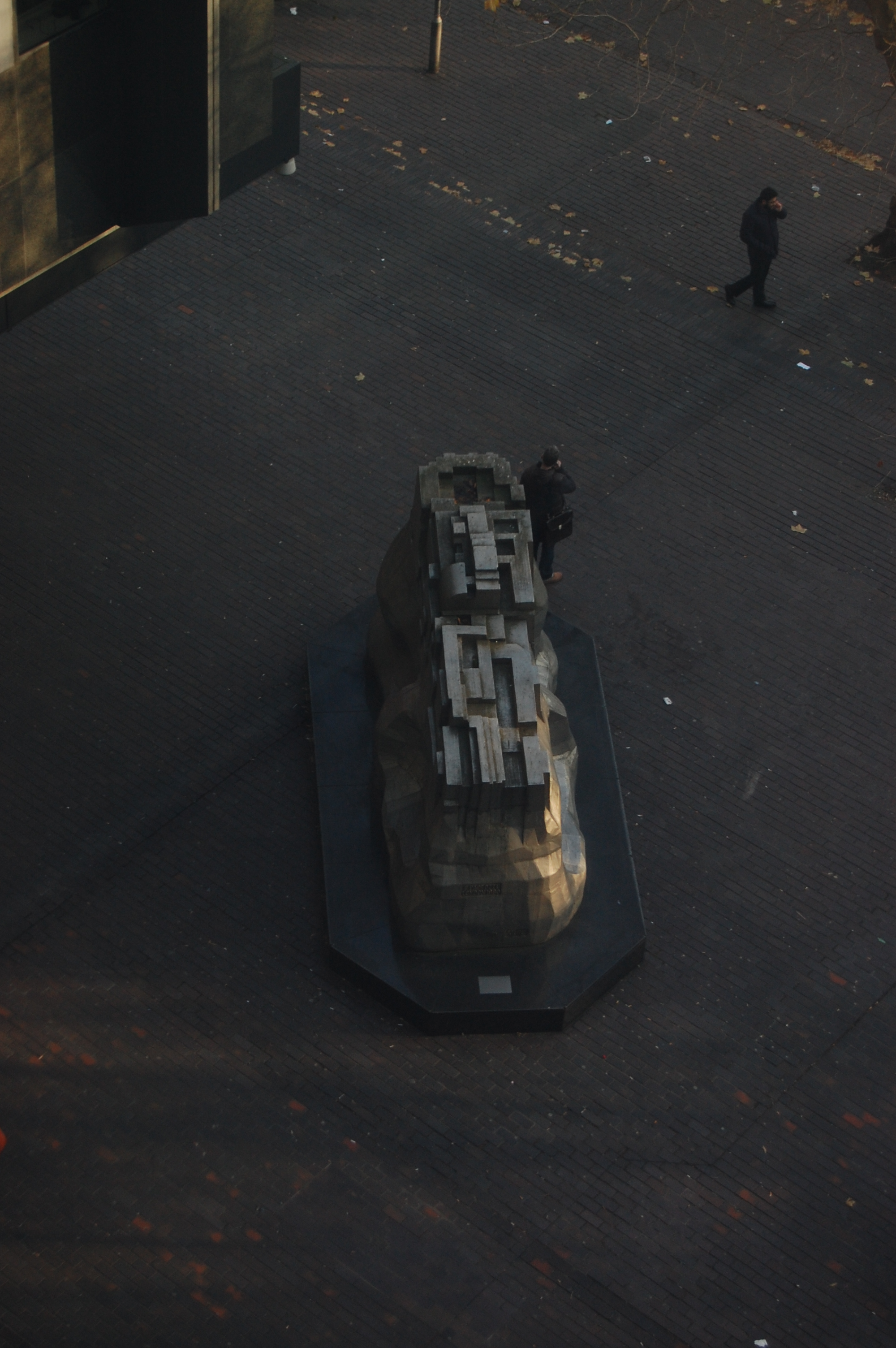
Stylised human body and face on top of the sculpture, visible from the surrounding tall buildings
