= Carl Joachim Friedrich =

German-American academic, writer and political theorist (1901–1984)

Carl Joachim Friedrich (/ˈfriːdrɪk/ FREE-drik; German: [kaʁl ˈjoːaxɪm ˈfʁiːdʁɪç]; June 5, 1901 – September 19, 1984) was a German-American professor and political theorist. He taught alternately at Harvard and Heidelberg until his retirement in 1971. His writings on state and constitutional theory, constitutionalism and government made him one of the world's leading political scientists in the post-World War II period. He is one of the most influential scholars of totalitarianism.

== Biography ==
=== Early years in Germany: 1901–1936 ===
Friedrich was born on June 5, 1901, in Leipzig, in the Kingdom of Saxony in the German Empire, the son of renowned professor of medicine Paul Leopold Friedrich, the inventor of the surgical rubber glove, and a Prussian countess of the von Bülow family. The Friedrichs were Protestant. He attended the Gymnasium Philippinum from 1911 to 1919, where he received an elite German secondary education focusing on classical languages and literature (at his American naturalization proceeding, he described his religion as "Homer"). Friedrich studied under Alfred Weber, the brother of Max Weber, at the University of Heidelberg, where he graduated in 1925, having also attended several other universities and even put in a brief stint working in the Belgian coal mines.

Friedrich's family had strong ties to the United States. His brother, Otto Friedrich, went on to become an industrialist prominent in the German rubber industry. Both brothers lived and studied in America on and off immediately after World War I, but Carl elected to remain in the United States and Otto to return to Germany. They temporarily broke off relations during the 1940s because of Otto's allegiance to the Nazi party and prominent role in German industry during the Third Reich, but they reestablished contact after the end of World War II.

In the 1920s, while a student in the United States, Carl founded, and was president of, the German Academic Exchange Service, through which he first met the love of his life, Lenore Pelham, also a writer and then a student at Rockford College, outside Chicago. The two later married. In 1926, he was appointed as a lecturer in government at Harvard University. He received his Ph.D. from the Heidelberg University in 1930. When Hitler came to power in 1933, he decided to remain in the United States and become a naturalized citizen.

An expert on German constitutional law and the conditions surrounding the breakdown of the Weimar Republic in 1933, Friedrich supported representative democracy. He strongly opposed direct democracy, however, particularly the use and misuse of referendums, as leading to totalitarianism. He stressed the necessity for maintaining the rule of law, supplemented by a strong infrastructure of civil institutions, and was highly suspicious of popular grass-roots movements.

=== Harvard University: 1936–1941 ===
Friedrich was appointed Professor of Government at Harvard University in 1936. Friedrich's main areas of thought were the problems of leadership and bureaucracy in government, public administration, and comparative political institutions. An extremely popular lecturer, Friedrich also wrote prolifically, producing 31 volumes on political history, government, and philosophy and editing another 22 (then the second most in Harvard's history). In the 1930s, Professor Friedrich also played a leading role, with one of his students, the then-unknown David Riesman, by his side, in efforts to help Jewish scholars, lawyers, and journalists who were fleeing Nazi Germany and other fascist regimes resettle in the United States. He persuaded one of them, the pianist Rudolf Serkin, to give a concert at his farm in Brattleboro, Vermont, an event which led to the establishment of the Marlboro Music Festival.

Friedrich, who was arguably the most knowledgeable scholar in his field (of German Constitutional history) of his time, was endowed with a healthy self-regard. Indeed, some of his colleagues at Harvard regarded him as a "somewhat hubristic person who was overly confident of his own abilities."

=== World War II and Cold War: 1941–1984 ===
Friedrich had joined the ranks of Harvard scholars who despised communist attempts to establish a classless society. In 1939 Friedrich first published a critique of communism, and in the course of World War II Friedrich developed fierce convictions on the Soviet Union. He regarded the Soviet Union as the mortal enemy of democracies. Friedrich maintained that by abolishing all separation of power in the quest for social utopia the Soviet Union would enslave the entire world. In Friedrich's mind, mass politics had to be reigned in by responsible elites and constitutional democracy.

Friedrich was determined to put Harvard University into the service of the democratic state and in 1946 he joined Talcott Parsons, Edward S. Mason, Edwin O. Reischauer and other Harvard faculty members to design a new academic program with courses in international economics, diplomacy, and state administration. Friedrich taught the first program on China and Japan, as well as Korea and the Philippines, two nations that had emerged from the Japanese empire. When the United States entered World War II Friedrich helped found the School of Overseas Administration to train officers in military government work. Between 1943 and 1946 Friedrich served as the director of the school and was a member of the executive committee of the Council for Democracy, which worked to convince the American people of the necessity for fighting totalitarianism and published pamphlets on liberal democracy.

In 1946 the Military Governor of Germany, General Lucius D. Clay, appointed Friedrich as Constitutional and Governmental Affairs Adviser, a position Friedrich held until 1949. Friedrich traveled to Allied-occupied Germany and helped to draft the constitutions of the German federal states Bavaria, Baden, and Hesse. In 1948 Friedrich helped draft the German constitution, known as Basic Law for the Federal Republic of Germany. Friedrich enshrined in these constitutions the teachings of Johannes Althusius on federalism and local autonomy in an effort to create a decentralized regime where federal states had authority over taxation, education, and cultural policy. To this end, Friedrich also enshrined in the constitution of the Federal Republic of Germany that the members of the upper house (Bundesrat) would be appointed by the parliaments of the federal states (Landtag).

Friedrich's constitutional vision for a new German identity was based on active participation in democratic institutions, where citizens invested in democracy to secure their own liberty. Friedrich deeply believed that a stable democracy required an elite that was committed to democracy and responsible bureaucracy. He therefore intervened in the ongoing reforms of German universities in the US occupied areas. He traveled between Heidelberg, Munich, and Berlin to organize meetings on the role of a university in a constitutional democracy. In 1948 he helped to establish the Free University of Berlin for which he designed a course program on political theory, democracy, and communism. This course program was in 1949 adopted by the University of Marburg, the University of Cologne, and the University of Hamburg.

In 1947 Friedrich and his Harvard colleagues launched a course program on Russian and the Soviet Union which in 1948 became the Russian Research Center. In the same year, communists gained control over Czechoslovakia and Allied-occupied Germany was divided into West Germany and East Germany in 1949. These rapid developments prompted Friedrich to orchestrate the Human Relations Area Files (HRAF) project, which was started in 1948 by Clellan S. Ford at Yale University. The HRAF collected and analyzed vast quantities of data to produce research reports for US diplomats on the world's cultures and political regimes. Shorter HRAF reports were issued as background reading to US military personnel stationed abroad. After the European continent was carved up in the 1955 Warsaw Pact, interest in European affairs grew and US diplomats required detailed knowledge about the history of European countries, regardless of whether they were allies or enemies in the Cold War. Friedrich became the head of the European studies division at Harvard University. He designed tough courses for students on Germany, Poland, Hungary, Britain, France and Italy. Friedrich also trained US diplomats on European history and politics before they were sent overseas.

In the 1950s Friedrich had the opportunity to put his ideas of a virtuous federalism again into practice when he acted as constitutional advisor for Puerto Rico, the Virgin Islands, and Israel. Friedrich also participated in a project to draft a constitution for the establishment of a European Political Community (EPC), which ultimately failed. In 1955 Friedrich was appointed Eaton Professor of the Science of Government at Harvard University. In 1956 Friedrich, together with his student Zbigniew Brzezinski, published Totalitarian Dictatorship and Autocracy which would become Friedrich's most cited book. In 1956 Friedrich was appointed Professor of Political Science at Heidelberg University where he lectured on occasion. In 1962 Friedrich was appointed president of the American Political Science Association. In 1967 Friedrich was appointed as president of the International Political Science Association and was awarded the Knight Commander's Cross of the German Order of Merit by the President of the Federal Republic of Germany. Upon his retirement in 1971 Friedrich became emeritus professor. He later taught at the University of Manchester and Duke University, among others.

Professor Friedrich's many students included such noted political theorists as Judith Shklar, Harvey Mansfield, and Benjamin Barber.

He died on September 19, 1984, in Lexington, Massachusetts.

== Ideas ==
Friedrich's concept of a "good democracy" rejected direct democracy as totalitarian, in favor of representative democracy. Some of the assumptions of Friedrich's theory of totalitarianism, particularly his acceptance of Carl Schmitt's idea of the "constitutional state", are viewed as potentially anti-democratic by Hans J. Lietzmann. Schmitt believed that the sovereign is above the law. Klaus von Beyme sees the main focus of Friedrich's theories as the "creation and preservation of robust institutions". This can be seen as influencing his work on the creation of Germany's States' constitutions.

== Bibliography ==
- THE NEW BELIEF IN THE COMMON MAN. By Carl J. Friedrich. 345 plus xii pp. Boston: Little, Brown & Co. $3. 1942.
- The Philosophy of Kant, Editor with editor's introduction [Kant's moral and political writings] (New York: Random House/Modern Library [#266], 1949).
- CONSTITUTIONAL GOVERNMENT AND DEMOCRACY (rev. ed.), by Carl J. Friedrich. Ginn and Company, Boston. 1950. Pp. xvi, 688.
- The Age of the Baroque: 1610–1660 (New York: Harper & Row, 1952).
- Der Verfassungsstaat der Neuzeit [revised German edition of 'Constitutional Government and Democracy'] (Berlin, 1953).
- The Philosophy of Hegel, edited with an introduction (New York: Random House/Modern Library, 1953).
- Die Philosophie des Rechts in Historischer Perspektive (Springer Verlag, 1955)
- Totalitarian Dictatorship and Autocracy. Co-authored by Carl J. Friedrich and Zbigniew Brzezinski. Cambridge: Harvard University Press, 1956. Second edition 1965.
- The Philosophy of History by Hegel, trans. J. Sibree, new introduction by C.J. Friedrich (Dover, 1956). ("[H]e revolutionized the sciences of man, of culture and society, and neither the humanities nor the social sciences have ever been able to think and talk again in the naive and simple terms that characterized them before Hegel wrote.")
- Totalitäre Diktatur (The Totalitarian Dictatorship). Stuttgart. 1957.
- Man and His Government: An Empirical Theory of Politics. New York: McGraw-Hill. 1963. ISBN 0070224161.
- Tradition and Authority. Oxford: Oxford University Press. 1972.
- The Pathology of Politics: Violence, Betrayal, Corruption, Secrecy, and Propaganda. New York: Harper & Row. 1972. ISBN 0060113677.
