= Focus Theatre =

Irish theatre

Coordinates: 53.334378°N 6.25388°W

- An Amharclann Fócais
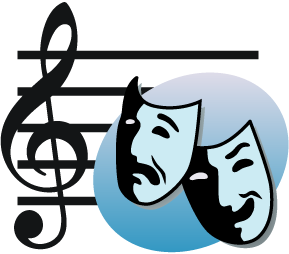
- Interactive map of Focus Theatre
- Address: 6A Pembroke Place; Dublin; Ireland

Construction
- Opened: 29 September 1967
- Closed: 30 April 2012
- Years active: 1967–2012

The Focus Theatre (Irish: An Amharclann Fócais) in Dublin, Ireland was a small theatre which for more than fifty years offered a variety of plays, from new and established writers, from its foundation in 1967 until its closure in 2012.

== History ==
In April 1963, the Irish American actor Deirdre O'Connell founded the Stanislavski Acting Studio - "the first actor-training studio of its kind in Ireland" - at the Pocket Theatre, in Dublin's Ely Place. The premises were soon sold, leading to several years where O'Connell temporarily housed the studio in a variety of city-center locations, including Westland Row, Kildare Street, the Pike Theatre (until it closed in 1964), and Fitzwilliam Square. In 1967, O'Connell's husband, Luke Kelly of The Dubliners, put up most of the capital to purchase and renovate a disused factory at 6 Pembroke Place. The site had been found by Declan Burke-Kennedy, a journalist and dramatist, who became a co-founder of the Focus Theatre, together with his wife, Mary Elizabeth. The theatre aspired to present the best of contemporary and classic world drama, and to develop new plays, and used Stanislavski's system "to explore the human condition through the craft of the actor". It opened on 29 September 1967, with a production of Doris Lessing's Play With a Tiger. More than two hundred and fifty productions were staged at the theatre. Several notable actors were associated with the Focus, including Gabriel Byrne, Brendan Coyle, Sabina Higgins (wife of the President of Ireland), Olwen Fouéré, Tom Hickey and Bosco Hogan. When Deirdre O'Connell died in 2001, Joe Devlin took over as artistic director.

The Focus Theatre closed in April 2012 due to funding issues. The building at Pembroke Place, now Mutiny Theatre, operates as a 39-seat theatre and screening room.
