= Gymnasium Philippinum =

School in Marburg, Hesse, Germany

Coordinates: 50°48′3″N 8°45′26″E

Philippinum High School
- German: Gymnasium Philippinum
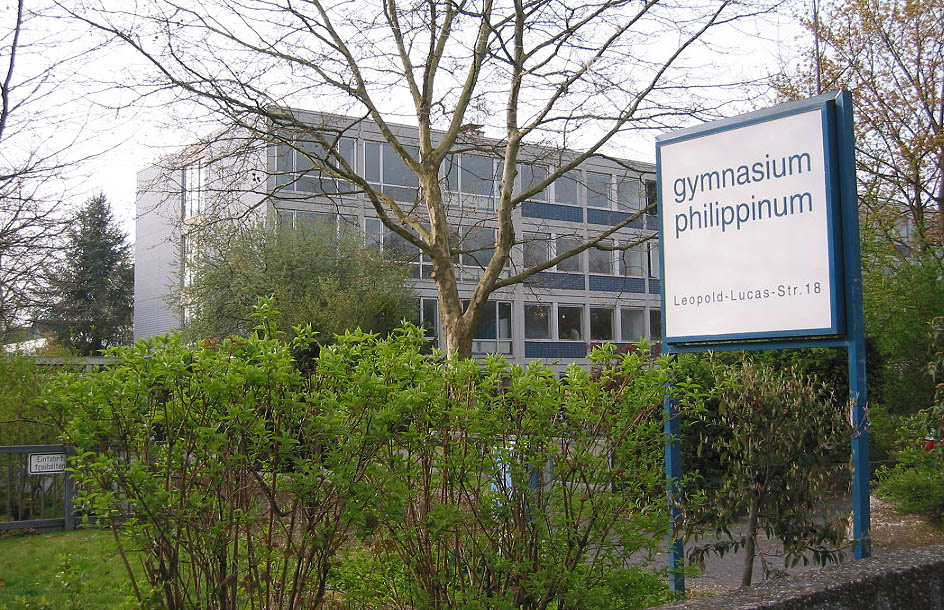

Information
- School type: Gymnasium
- Established: 1527; 498 years ago
- Gender: Boys (1527-1953); Mixed (1953-present)
- Website: philippinum.de

Gymnasium Philippinum or Philippinum High School is an almost 500-year-old secondary school in Marburg, Hesse, Germany.

== History ==
The Gymnasium Philippinum was founded in 1527 as a Protestant school based with the University of Marburg (Marburger University) created by Philipp I of Hesse. Its primary goal was to provide students with knowledge of Latin and Greek.

In 1833, the gymnasium attained independence from the university. After 1866, it became a royal-Prussian high school. In 1868, the school was moved into a gothic building in the Untergasse. In 1904, it received its current name, in honor of the school's founder on his 400th birthday.

In 1953, co-education was introduced to the former boys' school. In 1969, the school moved into a new building on Leopold Lucas road, opposite the Elizabeth school (Elisabethschule).

== Philippinum today ==
Since 2003, the Gymnasium Philippinum has been an all-day school. In 2006, the school term (German: Gymnasialzeit) was shortened to eight school years. A special emphasis of the school today is music instruction, with support available from the early years and an achievement course in music in the upper stage. The humanistic tradition of Philippinum continues in its foreign language instruction, with Latin and English beginning in the fifth year of education.

== Notable teachers ==
- August Friedrich Christian Vilmar (1833-1850)

== Notable alumni ==
- Johannes Althusius (16th century)
- Otto Ubbelohde (1875-1884)
- Bruno Strauss (1889-1969)
- Erwin Piscator (1903-1907)
- Carl Joachim Friedrich (1911-1919)
- Leo Strauss (1912-1917)
- Dieter Henrich (1940-1946)
- Christoph Heubner (1960s)
- Ingrid Arndt-Brauer (1970s)
- Henning Rübsam (1980s)
