= Maria Ley-Piscator =

Wife of Erwin Piscator

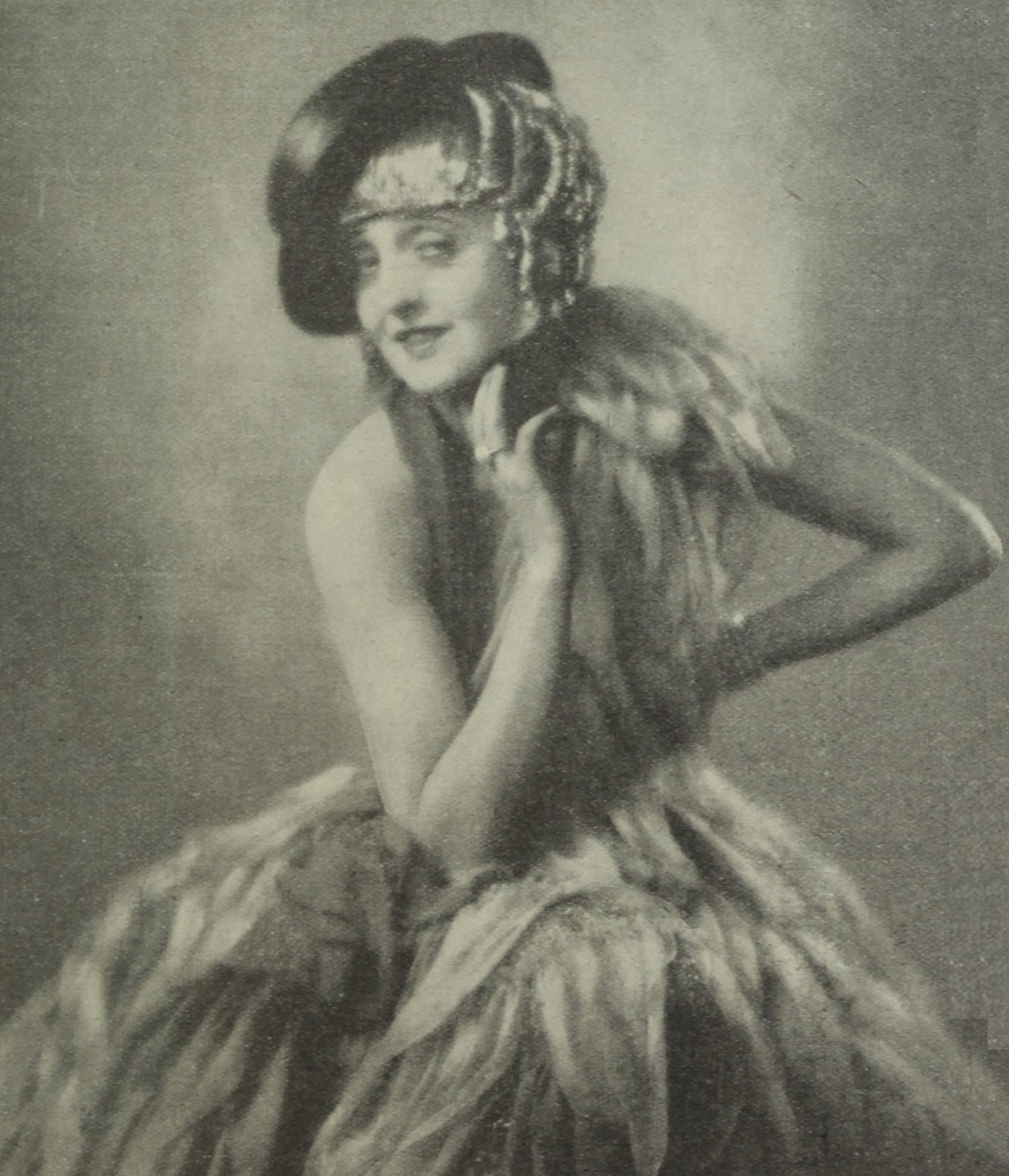
Maria Ley-Piscator (photographed by Franz Xaver Setzer)

Maria Ley-Piscator (born Friederike Flora Czada, 1 August 1898 – 14 October 1999) was an Austrian-American dancer and choreographer. She is best known as the wife of Erwin Piscator (1893–1966), Germany's famous left-wing theater director. Born on 1 August 1898 in Vienna, Austria-Hungary (now Austria), Maria Ley sought to create a theatrical career for herself as a dancer in Paris and Berlin. Later, she turned to choreography and helped in several stage productions with Max Reinhardt, including A Midsummer Night's Dream.

Maria Ley also studied literature at the Sorbonne, where she met Erwin Piscator (her third husband) during his exile in 1936. After marrying in Paris, the couple moved to Manhattan in 1939, where they founded the Dramatic Workshop at the New School for Social Research. Their students included Harry Belafonte, Marlon Brando and Tony Randall. Ley-Piscator directed several theatrical productions off Broadway.

During the 1970s she worked as a teacher at the Southern Illinois University Carbondale and at Stony Brook University.

Filmmaker Rosa von Praunheim portrayed her in his film Dolly, Lotte and Maria (1987).

Ley-Piscator lived at 17 East 76th Street, sometimes called the Piscator House, where Erwin and she had made a home prior to his return to Europe in the 1950s. Even after Erwin's death, Maria remained a fixture in NYC cultural circles. In 1988, encountering the 90-year-old matron of the arts at a reception at the former Goethe-Institut New York building at 1014 Fifth Avenue, journalist Claudia Steinberg described Ley-Piscator as a "tiny, delicate lady in the lilac velvet suit" who "continues to philosophize in whispers about the interplay between art and life."

Ley-Piscator died in New York in 1999 at the age of 101.

== Works ==
- Ley-Piscator, Maria. 1954. Lot's Wife. Indianapolis: Bobbs-Merrill.
- Ley-Piscator, Maria. 1967. The Piscator Experiment: The Political Theatre. New York: Heineman. Revised edition. Carbondale: Southern Illinois U P, 1970. ISBN 0-8093-0458-9.

== Other sources ==
- Rutkoff, Peter M. 1986. "Politics on Stage. Piscator and the Dramatic Workshop." New School: a History of the New School for Social Research. Ed. Peter M. Rutkoff and William B. Scott. New York: Macmillan. 172–195. ISBN 0-684-86371-5.
