= Raymond Watson (artist) =

Irish visual artist (born 1958)

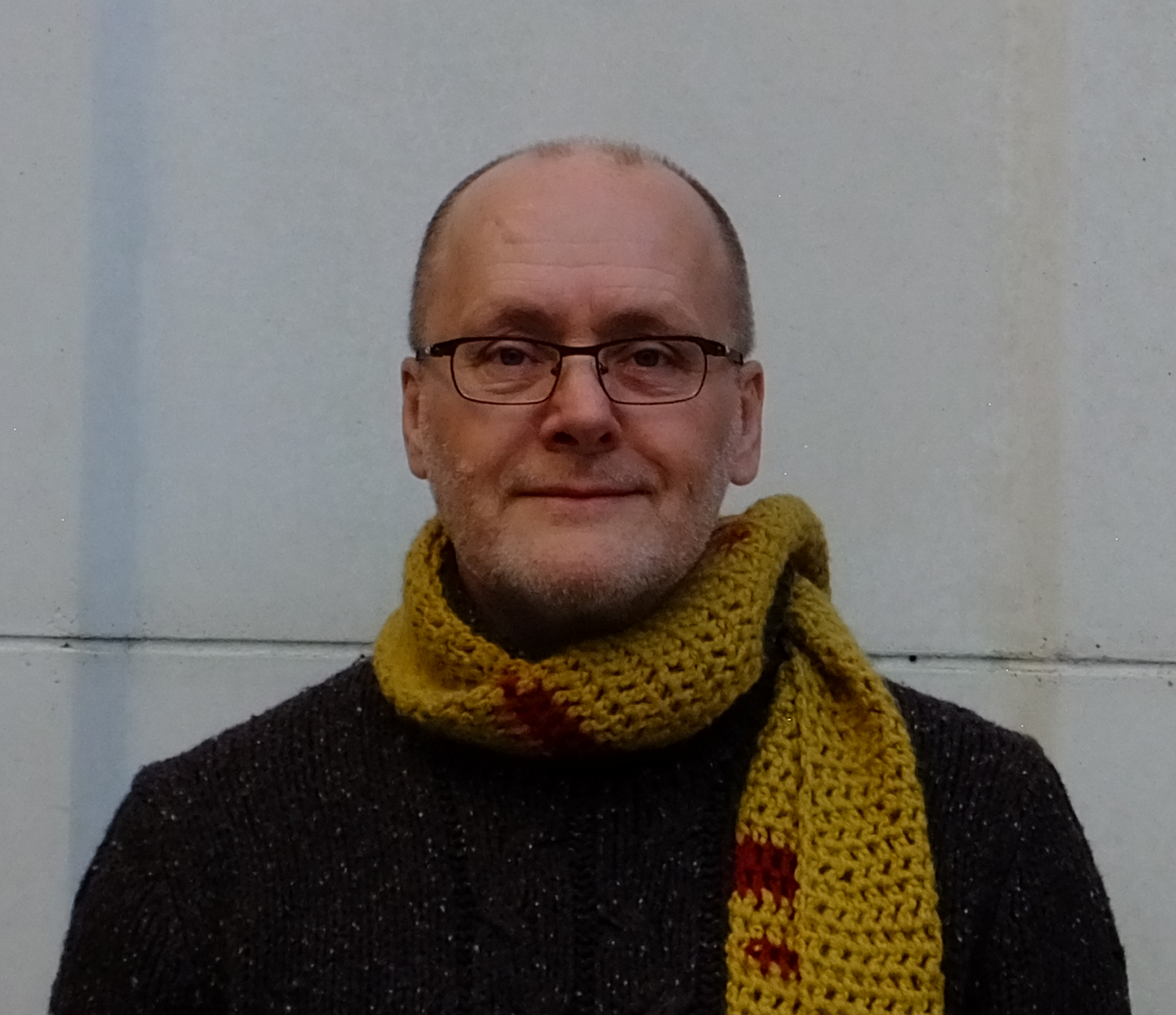
Raymond Watson Artist

Raymond P Watson (Born in 1958) is a visual artist from Belfast, Northern Ireland. He lives and works in Cushendall, in the Glens of Antrim. He studied Media Studies at the University of Ulster, obtaining a BA hons., and Master of Philosophy. He has worked as a Media Studies lecturer at the Belfast Metropolitan College, and worked as a group editor with a local publishing house for a number of years. He has produced artwork since the early 1990s and in 1999 stopped all other work to dedicate his energy to creating art. He has a substantial body of work influenced heavily by the recent political conflict in Northern Ireland. He is an eclectic artist who creates work in any media, commonly bronze, wood, clay, metals, paints cement, audio visual installations and most recently has produced a number of highly original soundscapes.

== Exhibitions ==
Since the 90s Watson has had many exhibitions across Ireland and in England, New York and Spain. He has contributed to joint exhibitions in many other countries. A notable piece of his art is the Hands of History sculpture. For this sculpture he managed to cast in bronze the hands of the political leaders who negotiated the Good Friday Agreement (Belfast Peace Agreement). Those cast are: David Trimble, Ulster Unionist Party, Gerry Adams Sinn Féin, John Hume Social Democratic Labour Party, Malachy Curran N.I.Labour Party, Monica McWilliams N.I. Women's Coalition, David Irvin Progressive Unionist Party, Gary McMicheal Ulster Democratic Party, Seán Neeson Alliance Party. The British Government is represented by Mo Mowlam the then Secretary of State. This sculpture is a unique historical record of the aspirations of the Agreement, designed to create a blueprint for a better future in between all conflicted parties in Ireland.

In March 2018 Raymond held an exhibition titled 'The Hands of History +20' to mark the 20th anniversary of the Good Friday Agreement, at Victoria Gallery and Museum, Liverpool. This exhibition was hosted by the Institute of Irish Studies (University of Liverpool) and curated by ArtisAnn Gallery (Belfast). For this exhibition he updated and created the Hands of History+20. Another 20 Hands were cast and added to the original sculpture. These new hands were of many VIPs and negotiators that were involved in the implementation of the Good Friday (peace) Agreement during those 20 crucial years. Amongst those cast were Tony Blair British PM, Bertie Ahern Irish PM, Lord Chris Patten and Sen. George Mitchell US Peace Envoy, and many others. For The Hands of History+20. Watson also created a number of new cutting edge installations. 'The Grappling Hook' - Watson brought an original Grappling Hook (secretly made almost 50 years earlier by prisoner planning to escape from Long Kesh Prison) to the Belfast Peace Wall, tied a rope to the Hook and scaled the wall to escape to the other side. A second unique installation titled 'The Keys', was created by displaying hundreds of keys from Belfast Crumlin Road Prison alongside an evocative sound piece that was created by using the keys as 'musical instruments'. Later this sound piece was developed into a soundscape experience and Watson released it in the form a vinyl album.

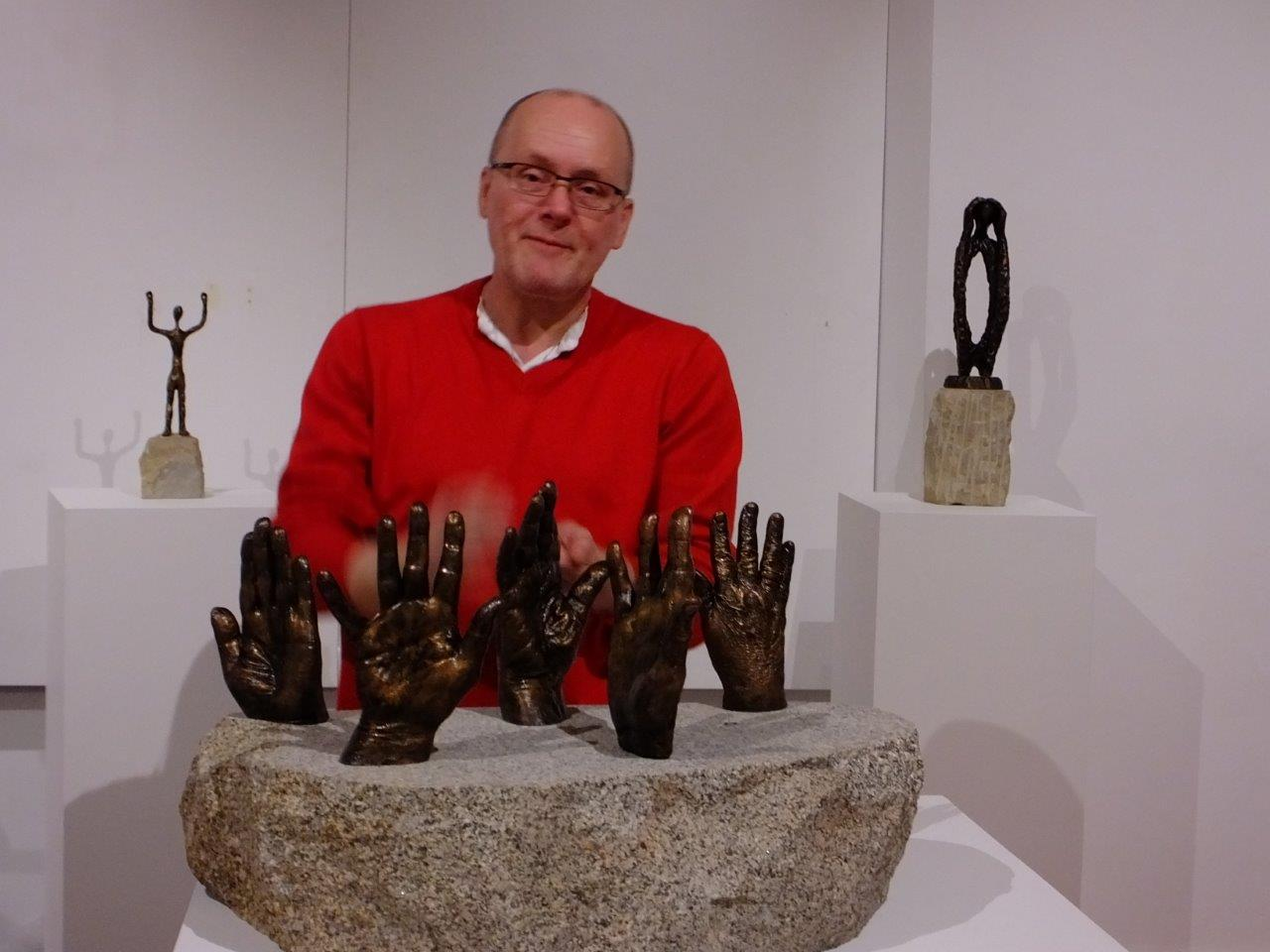
1

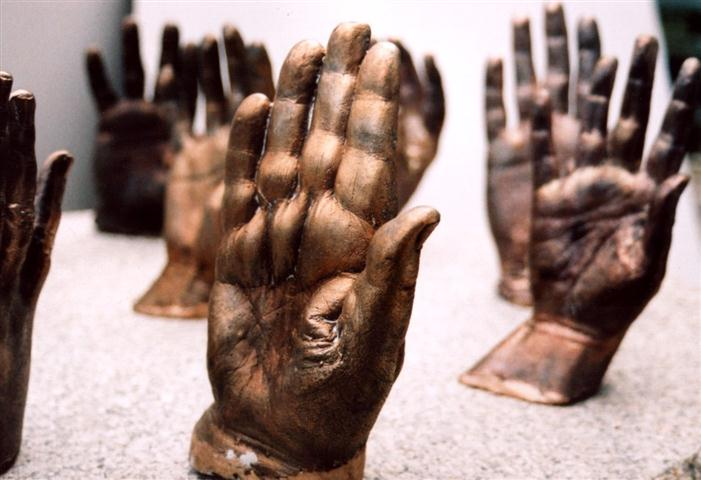
2

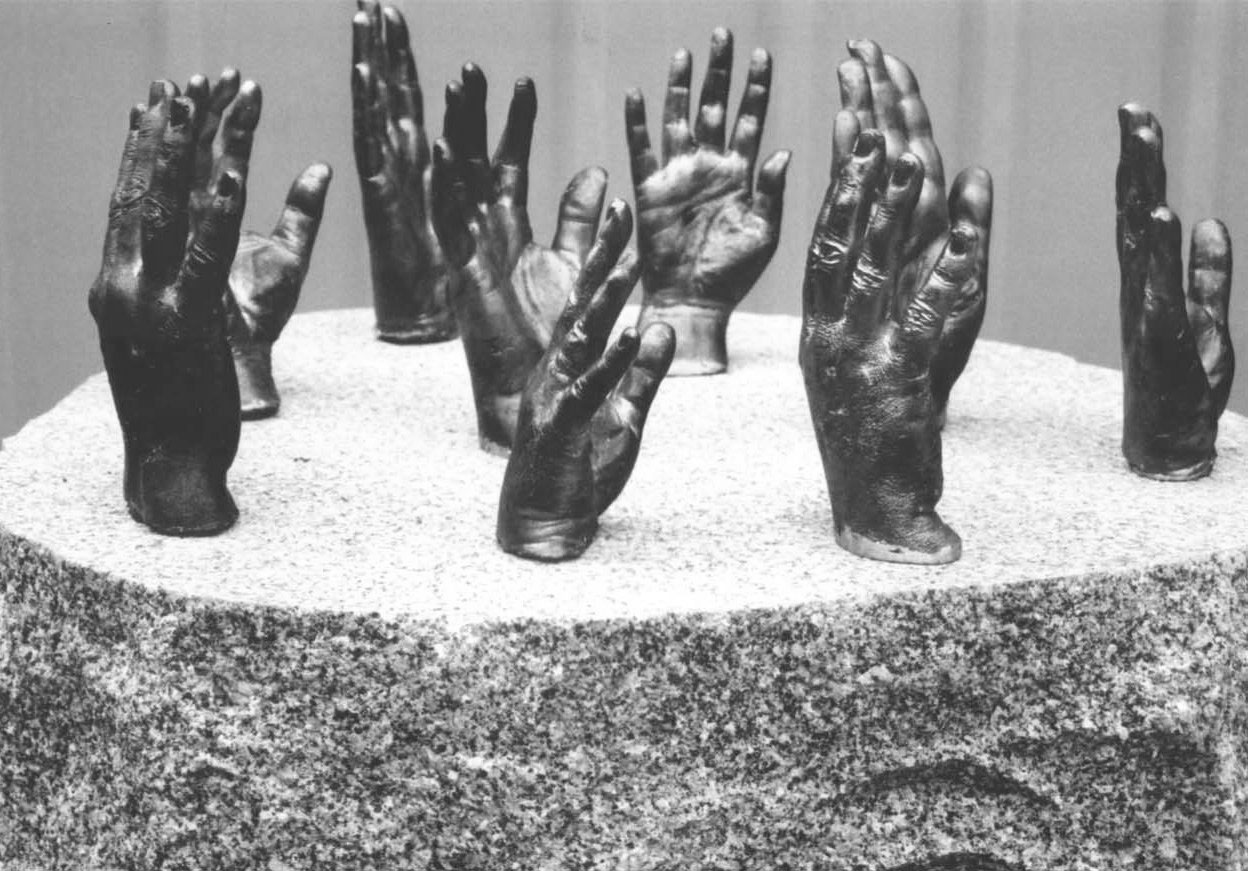
3

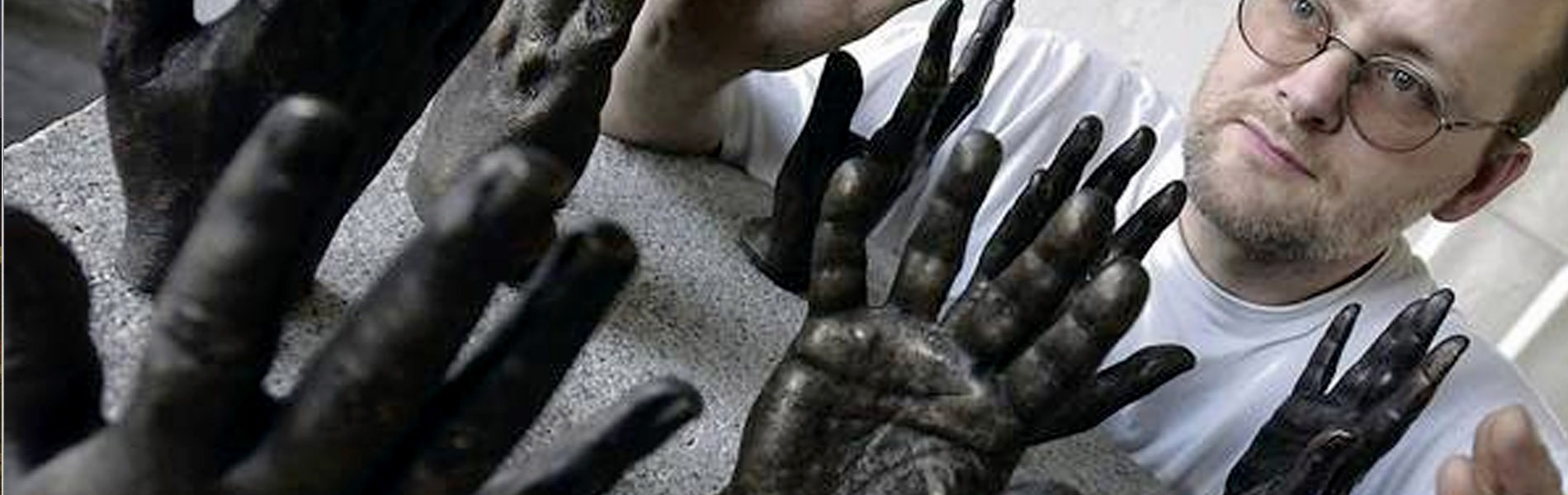
4

In 2011, Watson visited the Himalayas and was inspired by the positive motivations and intentions of those who created flew Tibetan Prayer Flags. He subsequently started a project to create the largest public art installation ever seen in Belfast. The Belfast Flags of Hope project was an installation of more than 10,000 art pieces created by communities across Belfast and other places. The Belfast Flags were installed along the ‘Belfast Peacewall’ and were a symbol of inclusive flag flying The project was in memory of murdered school boy Thomas Devlin and attended by Baroness May Blood. https://www.youtube.com/watch?v=kW-y2ar_Znw

In 2015 he exhibited artwork commemorating the discovery of one of Ireland's national treasures - The Broighter Boat, at the 'Towards Broighter' Exhibition in Limavady. Most recently he presented in the Artisann Gallery an exhibition that focused on the life and poetry of Seamus Heaney.

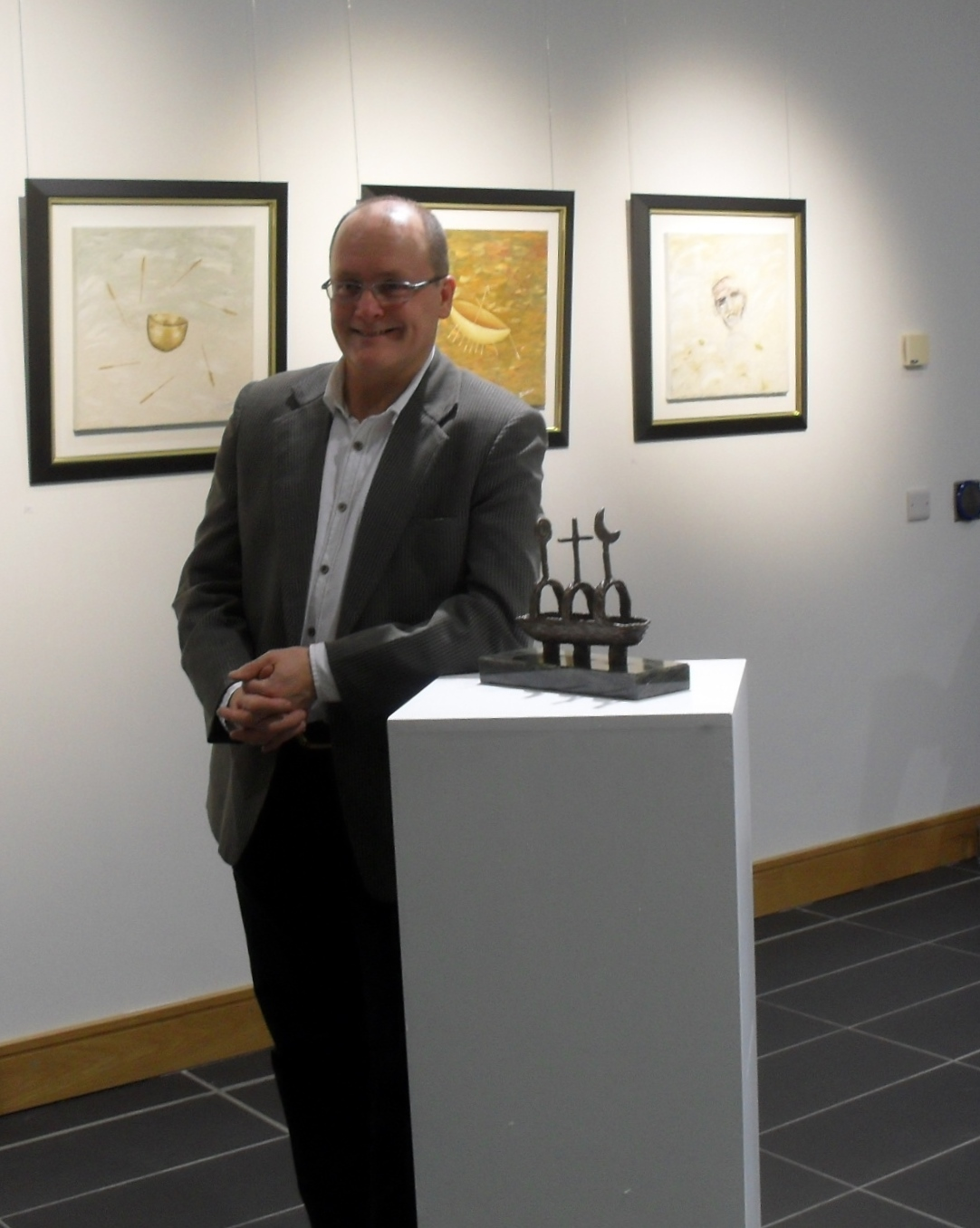
Raymond Watson artist presents the Mystery of The Broighter Boat

== International ==
He has worked on art projects in Australia, Africa and India. In Calcutta, India, he produced a large scale temporary sculpture called The Helix of Hope with street children and orphans. Besides exhibitions Raymond Watson has worked on many community art projects that are designed to enhance deprived or troubled societies. He has presented his art practice at many international conferences and his work is in many private collections. The Peace Flags have been exhibited in many locations including Australia

== Publications ==
In 2021 Raymond Watson featured in an art documentary film, Can Art Stop a Bullet? Created by Australians Bill Kelly and Mark Street. The film was later published as book by the same title.

In 2017 he wrote a book, title, Ireland versus Israel. This was published by Bill Drummond's publishing project Penkilnburn.

In 2014 he produced a book on his artwork, titled: The Cell Was my Canvas In 2016 The Cell Was my Canvas was updated and translated into German, it is now available on line as an ebook.
In 2010 the book Belfast Flags of Hope was published jointly by Raymond Watson and supported by the Thomas Devlin Fund. This publication outlined the process of an earlier phase of Flags of Hope project.
