= Vilunya Diskin =

American author (born 1941)

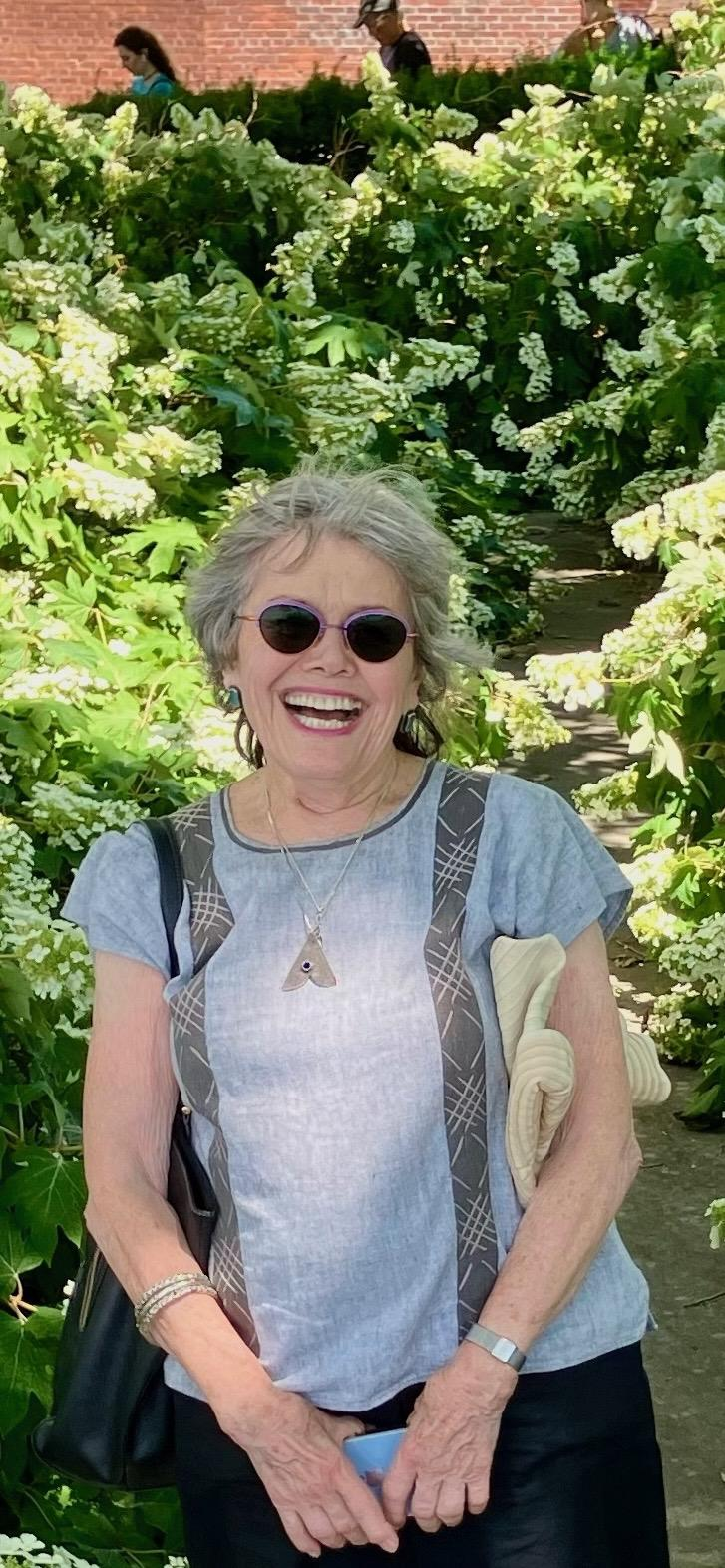
- Born: Wilhelmina Fliegelman; 1 May 1941 (age 85); Przemyslany, Lvov District, Poland
- Other name: Wilma Firstenburg
- Education: UC Berkeley, UCLA
- Notable work: Our Bodies, Ourselves
- Spouse: Martin Diskin
- Children: 2

Vilunya Diskin (née Wilhelmina Fliegelman, born 1 May 1941) is one of the founders of the Boston Women's Health Book Collective and a co-author of Our Bodies, Ourselves living in Boston, Massachusetts. She was born in the town of Przemyslany, Poland, and eventually immigrated to the United States in 1948. In the United States, she was adopted and raised by an American Jewish family in Los Angeles. During her time at university, she became involved in feminist activism, which eventually led to her involvement in the creation of the collective (and publication) Our Bodies, Ourselves.

== Early life and education ==
Vilunya Fliegelman was born in the town of Przemyslany, Poland, on 1 May 1941, alongside a twin sister named Amalia, who died at three months of age. Her grandfather owned a textile mill, her mother was a lawyer, and her father was a chemist. In response to the creation of the Jewish Ghetto in the region, Diskin's parents made arrangements for their Catholic maid to take Vilunya to her village and raise her until the end of the war. In 1944, after the Soviets liberated the Lvov district of Poland (now Lviv, Ukraine) from Nazi occupation, the maid brought Diskin to the only synagogue in the district, where she was then given to Rabbi Israel Leiter and his wife Esther. Vilunya's mother died in the Lwow Ghetto in 1941, while her father disappeared during the war.

The Leiters were part of a partisan group that was kidnapping Jewish children from Catholic orphanages and sending them to Israel. When the couple received a warning that they were to be arrested, they fled with Vilunya to Czechoslovakia and then to Hamburg, Germany, where they lived for 2 years. In 1947, they boarded a Swedish ship, The Gripsholm, which took them to New York where they were put up in an apartment by the HIAS (Hebrew Immigrant Aid Society). The HIAS had a policy that refugee children were to be placed with American families after arriving in America, and so Diskin was adopted by an American Jewish Family from Los Angeles, the Firstenbergs. They re-named her Wilma.

Vilunya Diskin attended UC Berkeley and later UCLA, graduating with a Bachelors in Anthropology in 1963.

== Activism ==
As a university student at UCLA, Diskin was involved in the Civil Rights Movement. She believed that fighting for the rights of all people is "integral to Jewish values and peoplehood". Diskin also became involved in Anti-War movements and women's liberation movements. While living in Cambridge, Massachusetts, Diskin joined a consciousness-raising group at MIT that became one of the first collectives of Bread and Roses (women's liberation group in Boston). This group later branched into the group that would become the Boston Women's Health Book Collective, and later, Our Bodies, Ourselves. These groups came to shape Diskin's work life and contributed to her personal growth.

After the creation and popularization of Our Bodies, Ourselves, Diskin focused on international women's issues and has since traveled extensively to promote women's health particularly in Mexico and in India.

== Our Bodies, Ourselves ==
On May 11, 1969, Vilunya and her good friend, Jane Pincus, attended a workshop at Emmanuel College called "Women and Their Bodies", which was at Boston's first Female Liberation Conference, led by Nancy Miriam Hawley. The women who attended this workshop bonded over their collective outrage about their experiences with demeaning and sexist doctors, and collaborated to develop their own reports on women's bodies and health. They called themselves the "Doctors Group" and developed a 12 session course on women's health which was held at MIT and later reworked into a 193 page booklet. The revised booklet, Women and Their Bodies (renamed Our Bodies, Ourselves) was published in 1971, and the group officially became the Boston Women's Health Book Collective in 1972. The first commercial edition of Our Bodies, Ourselves was published in 1973.

Diskin appeared in the 2015 documentary on the project, She's Beautiful When She's Angry.

== Personal life ==
During her studies, Vilunya met her husband, Martin Diskin, a descendant of Russian-immigrant Jews who later joined the MIT faculty in the department of Anthropology in 1967. Martin Diskin had helped to create the Latin American Studies program at MIT, and was "the first recipient of the MIT John Navas Faculty Foreign Travel Fund teaching award in 1982". Vilunya and Martin shared a passion for social justice and both studied the anthropology of societies in Latin America. During Martin's time at MIT, they lived in Cambridge, Massachusetts, then Lexington, and then spent several years doing anthropological field work in countries such as Mexico, Nicaragua, Honduras, El Salvador and Colombia.

Diskin has two children, the first of whom was born in 1965. Diskin wanted to give birth without drugs or surgical intervention, and struggled to find a doctor who would allow her to do so. She has lived in Greater Boston since the 1960s, and is a longtime resident of Jamaica Plain.

== See also ==
- Nancy Miriam Hawley
- Esther Rome
