= Simone Forti =

American postmodern artist, dancer and choreographer (1935–2026)

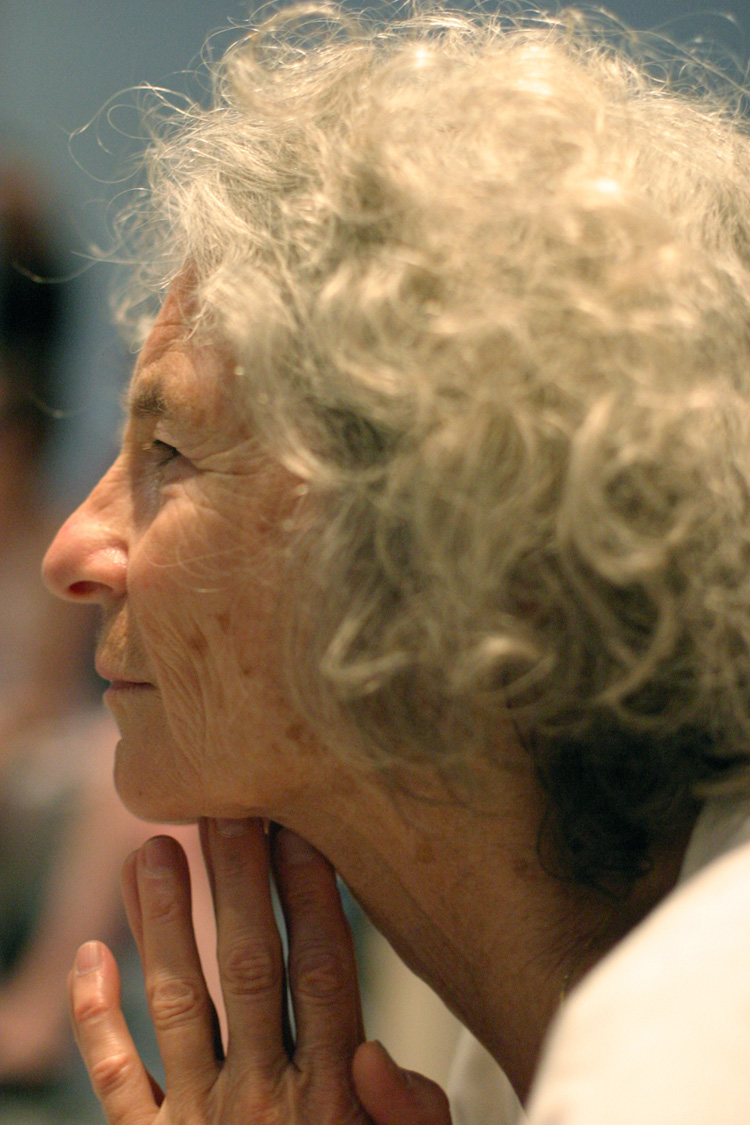
- Forti in 2004
- Born: March 25, 1935; Florence, Italy
- Died: July 2026 (aged 91); Los Angeles, California, U.S.
- Occupation: Artist
- Known for: Work in postmodern dance
- Spouses: Robert Morris (m. 1955–1962); Robert Whitman (m. 1962–1966); Peter Van Riper (m. 1974–1981)

Simone Forti (March 25, 1935 – July 2026) was an American postmodern artist, dancer, choreographer, and writer. From the 1950s onward, she exhibited, performed, and taught workshops throughout the world. Her innovations in postmodern dance, including her seminal 1961 body of work, Dance Constructions, along with her contribution to the early Fluxus movement, have influenced many notable dancers and artists.

Forti first apprenticed with Anna Halprin in the 1950s and later worked alongside artists and composers Nam June Paik, Steve Paxton, La Monte Young, Trisha Brown, Charlemagne Palestine, Peter Van Riper, Dan Graham, Yoshi Wada, Robert Morris, and others.

Her published books include Handbook in Motion (1974, The Press of the Nova Scotia College of Art and Design), Angel (1978, self-published), Oh Tongue (2003, [reprinted by Nero Editions, Rome, in 2023], and Unbuttoned Sleeves (2006) Beyond Baroque Foundation, ed. Fred Dewey), and New Book (2024), published by Nero Editions. At the time of her death, she was represented by Raffaella Cortese Gallery in Milan, Italy, and her work is held in the permanent collections of the Museum of Modern Art (MOMA) in New York, the Stedelijk Museum in Amsterdam, the Generali Foundation in Vienna, the Whitney Museum of American Art in New York, and the Moderna Museet in Stockholm.

== Early life ==
Forti was born in Florence, Italy, on March 25, 1935, to Jewish parents Milka Forti (née Greunstein) and Mario Forti. In the winter of 1938, the Forti family, including Forti's older sister Anna, left Italy to escape antisemitic persecution. The family crossed the northern border into Switzerland, then spent six months in Bern while Milka was ill. When Milka recovered, the family sailed to the United States in early 1939. The Fortis eventually settled in Los Angeles, where Forti attended public schools Gardner Street Elementary School, John Burroughs Middle School, and Fairfax Senior High School. After graduating from Fairfax High School in 1953, Forti attended Reed College in Portland, Oregon from 1953 to 1955. In 1955, Forti and her partner, artist Robert Morris, left Reed College and moved to San Francisco, California. The couple married there the same year and Forti began working under the name Simone Morris.

Soon after moving to the Bay Area, Forti enrolled in classes at the Halprin-Lathrop School, co-founded by dancer/choreographer Anna Halprin. When Halprin founded the San Francisco Dancer's Workshop (formerly known as the Dancer's Workshop of Marin) in 1955, Forti followed her to continue studying Halprin's work in Dance Improvisation. Forti studied under Halprin from 1955 to 1959, during which time she contributed to early works by Halprin and around San Francisco, along with other members of the Dancer's Workshop, including A.A. Leath and John Graham. Through the Dancer's Workshop, Forti also taught children's and adult's dance workshops throughout Marin County.

== Career ==
=== New York and Dance Constructions ===
In 1959, Forti moved to New York with Morris. While also working as a nursery school teacher during the day, Forti enrolled in a composition and improvisation class at the Merce Cunningham Studio, taught by educator/musicologist Robert Ellis Dunn. These classes introduced Forti to the work of John Cage and she met and began working with dancers who later became influential in the field of Postmodern dance, including Trisha Brown, Yvonne Rainer, and Steve Paxton.

Forti's first development of her Dance Constructions series was publicly presented at New York City's Reuben Gallery in December 1960, in an exhibition shared with Jim Dine and Claes Oldenburg, titled Happenings at the Reuben Gallery. During this exhibition, Robert Morris and Yvonne Rainer performed See Saw, and Forti and Patty Mucha (then Patty Oldenburg, Claes Oldenburg's then-spouse) performed Rollers (now titled Roller Boxes) with the contributions of audience members. In Thinking With the Body (2014, University of Chicago Press and Hirmer), curator Sabine Breitwieser wrote about Forti's Dance Constructions, "One could look at the Dance Constructions as problematizing everyday or, as you call them, pedestrian movements. If you take something out of an everyday context and isolate it, then it becomes something else. Using a rope to scale a steep ramp in Slant Board, for instance, evokes a typical climbing movement, but you've turned it to an isolated action that lacks a purpose, that exists just for itself."

In May 1961, Forti presented a full evening of pieces she called Five Dance Constructions & Some Other Things at Yoko Ono's studio. Performers that night included Forti, Ruth Allphon, Marni Mahaffay, Robert Morris, Steve Paxton, Yvonne Rainer, and Carl Lehmann-Haupt.

These pieces proved to be influential in both the fields of dance and visual arts, and have been performed around the world since their development. Dance critic Jennifer Dunning wrote in her October 1991 New York Times review, "Simone Forti presented her first dance program in 1960 and since then has had a steadily increasing influence on post-modernist choreographers interested in exploring 'natural', or nonformalist, movement and dance." Stuart Comer, the Chief Curator of Media and Performance Art at MOMA, New York, has said that the exhibitions of Dance Constructions at the Reuben Gallery and Yoko Ono's loft were "a watershed moment when the relationship between bodies and objects, movement and sculpture, was being fundamentally rethought."

Steve Paxton and Yvonne Rainer have cited Forti's 1961 Dance Constructions concert as a pivotal influence on their creative direction which encouraged them to establish the Judson Dance Theater, a collective of dancers, composers, and visual artists who performed at the Judson Memorial Church in Greenwich Village between 1962 and 1964.

On the exhibition of Forti's Dance Constructions, Yvonne Rainer wrote, in Simone Forti: Thinking With the Body (2014), "it seemed that a vacuum sealed that evening for over a year until her performers could get the Judson Dance Theater up and running. Simone was its inspiration and fountainhead. We all owe her."

Dancer Steve Paxton also wrote, "All I know is that this small, radical group of works by Forti was like a pebble tossed into a large, still, and complacent pond. The ripples radiated. Most notably, Forti's event happened prior to the first performance at Judson Memorial Church by the choreographers from Robert Dunn's composition class, and they took courage from it." (2014)

In December 2015, the Museum of Modern Art in New York acquired the Dance Constructions as part of their permanent collection in the Department of Media and Performance.

=== Happenings ===
In 1962, Forti and Robert Morris separated. Forti started living and working with artist Robert Whitman, and the two married in 1962. During their six-year marriage, Forti was part of Whitman's performance group and she collaborated with him on many of his Happenings. Some of these performances included American Moon (1960), Hole (1963), Flower (1963), Water (1963), Nighttime Sky (1965), and Prune Flat (1965). During this time, Simone wrote and performed under the name Simone Whitman.

After her divorce from Whitman, Forti accompanied her parents on a trip to Italy in 1968 and decided to stay and live in Rome. Forti began working with gallerist Fabio Sargentini, whose gallery, L'Attico, was a gathering point for Arte Povera artists at the time. Forti showed a two-evening retrospective of Dance Constructions at L'Attico in 1968. In addition, Forti performed two of her other pieces, Bottom and Sleep Walkers (alternatively titled Zoo Mantras ).

Sleep Walkers was developed out of Forti's observations of animals at the Rome Zoo, now known as the Bioparco di Roma. Forti specifically referred to developing the movement of swinging her head back and forth and a movement called "banking" from watching polar bears' and elephants' repetitive pacing inside their enclosures.

In the essay "Animate Matter: Simone Forti in Rome" (2014), art historian Julia Bryan-Wilson writes, "In Sleepwalkers [sic], Forti takes cues from animals that develop (and continually replicate) patterns of movement in response to environments of confinement. By segmenting and then repeating small passages of movement, for instance by isolating a few steps out of the flow of the elephant's many other motions, she creates an almost musical sense of pause, interval and tempo." Bryan-Wilson wrote further about this performance in the article "Simone Forti Goes to the Zoo", published in October (2015).

While in Rome, Forti introduced Sargentini to several Postmodern dancers and artists she had worked with in New York. Sargentini and Forti organized a dance and music festival in 1969, Danza Volo Musica Dinamite (Dance Flight Music Dynamite), in which Forti, Steve Paxton, Yvonne Rainer, Trisha Brown, David Bradshaw, and Deborah Hay, among others, performed and exhibited.

Forti performed in two more of Sargentini's festivals while going back and forth from Rome to New York, including Festival Music and Dance U.S. (1972), and Musica e danza contemporanea (1974). Other musicians and artists that performed in these festivals included Joan Jonas, Charlemagne Palestine, and La Monte Young.

=== Woodstock ===
Forti moved back to New York in August 1969 to attend the Woodstock Music & Art Fair. Forti ended up staying in Woodstock, New York, for a year, living communally and experimenting with LSD, which she wrote about in her 1974 book Handbook in Motion. ́’́́

She moved back to southern California in 1970, where she started living with a group of artists associated with the California Institute of the Arts (CalArts). Her housemates at the time were artists Nam June Paik, Alison Knowles, and musician Peter Van Riper, her future husband. The first house the artists shared was in the Los Feliz area of Los Angeles, and later in Piru, California.

From 1970 to 1972, Forti occasionally substituted for Allan Kaprow at CalArts, having known Kaprow from working together on Happenings in New York with her then spouse Robert Whitman. Forti initially taught at the Villa Cabrini campus in Burbank, then at CalArts' permanent location in Valencia, CA. Forti also led unofficial workshops and dance and music jams called "Open Gardenia" on the CalArts campus. At this time, Forti began her life-long Tai Chi practice, studying with Tai Chi master Marshall Ho'o. Forti began collaborating with musician/composer Charlemagne Palestine, who was also working with artists associated with CalArts. Together, Forti and Palestine developed a performance practice titled Illuminations, which they performed internationally from 1971 on as an ongoing process, including a staging at the Louvre in 2014, and Vleeshal Markt in 2016. In 2021, Illuminations Revisted was performed at Il Centro per l'Arte Contemporanea Luigi Pecci, Prato, Italy, with Sarah Swenson interpreting in Forti's absence.

In 1972, the Press of the NSCAD University invited Forti to Halifax, Nova Scotia to write a book, as part of their collection, The Nova Scotia Series - Source Materials of the Contemporary Arts. Forti lived in Halifax for two years, from 1972 to 1974, writing and editing Handbook in Motion (1974). In Handbook, Forti described several pivotal moments in her career up to that point and several of her pieces, including Herding, Face Tunes, Cloths, Fallers, and several Dance Construction pieces. The book also contains photographs, poems, and drawings, as well as copied pages from Forti's journals and notebooks and has been translated into French and has been published in 2nd and 3rd editions in English.

=== Big Room with Peter Van Riper ===
Forti returned to New York in the spring of 1974. There, she began a relationship with artist and musician Peter Van Riper, who had been Forti's housemate while working in the CalArts scene from 1970 to 1972. Forti and Van Riper were married at the end of 1974, and lived together in SoHo in a Fluxhouse Co-Operative loft on Broadway, an artist live-work complex organized by George Maciunas.

Forti and Van Riper began collaborating on a dance and music performance practice, titled Big Room (alternatively titled Home Base) in 1975. Big Room consisted of Van Riper playing music (typically on a saxophone) and Forti simultaneously performing movements based on her observations of animals, similar to her 1968 work, Sleep Walkers (alternatively titled Zoo Mantras). Sally Banes wrote that Big Room "creates a sense of mutual play between the two, a sense of trust and shared exploration, relying on preferences of the moment while paying attention to the present needs of the partner." Forti and Van Riper performed Big Room from 1975 to 1980, in France as well as in the United States.

=== Holography ===
In 1976, Van Riper introduced Forti to physicist and artist Lloyd Cross, who was developing pioneering work in holography in San Francisco. Together, Forti and Cross made several integral holograms (also called a multiplex hologram), a type of hologram that incorporates cinematography to produce a three-dimensional image that appears to move. The integral holograms Forti and Cross made together used imagery of Forti performing solo, except for Huddle (1977), which shows a small group of people performing a Huddle (one of Forti's Dance Construction pieces). In a multi-generational conversation with art critic Peter Frank and artist Amadour, Forti remarked, "we ran into a huddle in the center. That was the one piece that relied on something other than a built structure. It can be anywhere from six to nine people, and they form a close huddle together to be a strong unit. Then they take turns climbing over, on top of one another, and down again, becoming part of the supporting structure. They take turns with someone else going up, climbing over, and down again. Each of the three pieces had a duration of 10 minutes. They are durational pieces. Three days a week, performers activate it four times a day.

The integral holograms Forti and Cross made together were first exhibited in 1978 at the Sonnabend Gallery in New York, in an exhibition titled Simone Forti: Movement Holograms, and continue to be exhibited worldwide. The hologram Striding/Crawling is owned by the Whitney Museum of American Art as part of their permanent collection. The hologram Angel (1977) is owned by the Stedelijk Museum in Amsterdam.

=== Planet at P.S.1 ===
While back in New York, Forti continued to research the movements of animals in captivity, as she had been doing in Rome, visiting both the Central Park Zoo and Bronx Zoo. Julia Bryan-Wilson wrote further about Forti's identifying with zoos animals in 2015,

"Rather than turning to animals for a model of 'natural' liberation, Forti came to them out of despair, a shared sense of dislocation, loneliness, and isolation. At the same time, she did not neglect their adaptability, attending closely to their moments of connection and collective recreation. She was constantly aware that their movements were shaped not only by their state of captivity but also by their inner reserves of strength. She mentions, for instance, 'the big cats' compulsive pacing at the fence, which seemed to provide a modicum of relief, and writes that it gave her 'a new view of what it was that I was doing when I was dancing.' Movement is, for the animals as well as for her, a method of control and redirected awareness: 'At times I've escaped an oppressive sense of fragmentation by plunging my consciousness into cyclical momentum.'"

Forti's continued interest in these captive animals' movements developed into the large group performance Planet, first performed in 1976 at P.S.1, as part of the exhibition, The Institute for Art and Urban Resources presents Group Works by Simone Forti at P.S.1. In Planet, about forty people performed the movement vocabulary Forti had been developing in her classes, inspired by animal movements Forti observed in zoos. Performers included David Appel, Sally Banes, Pooh Kaye, and Terrence O'Reilly, Nina Martin, and Eric Hess, among others. Peter Van Riper performed live music. Banes identified some of the animals performed by a few dancers: "several performers did animal movements – including a bird (Pooh Kaye), a lion (Forti), an elephant (Sally Banes), a monkey (David Appel), three young bears (Anne Hammel, David Appel, Pooh Kaye), and lizards (Terry O'Reilly, David Taylor)."

=== Logomotion and News Animations ===
The School of Visual Arts, SVA, New York, hired Forti as an instructor of Performance Art in 1983. She continued teaching at SVA for four years, until 1987. During this period, Forti developed a new type of performance called Logomotion, an improvisational dance practice that involves both movement and speaking. The first public performance of Logomotion took place at the SVA in May 1986 (this performance is alternatively titled as the first News Animation performance). In Contact Quarterly, Forti wrote about the development of Logomotion: "In 1985 I started developing a dance/narrative form with words and movement springing spontaneously from a common source. It's been a way for me to know what's on my mind. What's on my mind before I think it through, while it's still a wild feeling in my bones. The thoughts and images seem to flash through my motor centers and my verbal centers simultaneously, mixing and animating both speech and physical embodiment. Spatial, structural, emotional. I've come to call this Logomotion. I see it as a performance form, and as a practice."

Forti performed Logomotion both as a solo performance and as a group performance, often with dancer Carmela Hermann, Claire Filmon, or Batyah Schachter, or the members of Simone Forti & Troupe, an ensemble Forti formed with four of her students in 1986.

From her Logomotion work, Forti developed her practice of News Animations, which is also a performance that incorporates both movement and speaking. With New Animations, Forti focused upon speaking about contemporary issues present in news media, including politics, climate change, and social issues. She wrote about News Animations saying, "I've been dancing the news. Talking and dancing, being all the parts of the news."

Forti performed News Animations at numerous venues around the world from 1986 onward, including a 2012 performance at the Hammer Museum in Westwood, Los Angeles, CA, as part of Made in L.A. 2012: Los Angeles Biennial.

=== Simone Forti & Troupe ===
Forti continued to teach dance workshops and develop new work in her Broadway loft in the years immediately following her separation from Van Riper in 1981. In 1986, the Yellow Springs Cultural Center in Chester Springs, Pennsylvania, invited Forti to perform on their campus. Forti asked four of her workshop students at the time, K.J. Holmes, Lauri Nagel, David Rosenmiller, and David Zambrano, to perform with her at Yellow Springs. This group of five dancers formed an ensemble, Simone Forti & Troupe. The original lineup of dancers performed together until 1989, when Eric Schoefer joined the ensemble and David Rosenmiller left. Simone Forti & Troupe performed group pieces in multiple cities across the United States from 1986 to 1991.

The main idea behind the group was to develop what Forti called "land portraits" for each location in which they performed.

The group also often incorporated live drawing into their performances, such as with the piece To Be Continued, performed at St. Mark's Church in-the-Bowery on April 16 and April 19, 1991. Of the live drawing, Forti wrote, "For us, the drawing of the objects was a bridge, and as we came to be intimate with the drawing, it worked as an analogy. If we could draw what we saw, we could 'body move' what we saw, with all the kinetic stimulation that can come from the developing page now coming from our movement in itself and in its relationship to its source: a torn box, a balcony of repeating arches, a corner where steam pipes disappear into the wall."

=== Mad Brook Farm ===
In 1988, Forti bought a cabin at Mad Brook Farm in East Charleston, Vermont, a small community that was settled into by a group of artists during the back-to-the-land movement of the 1960s, where her longtime friend and collaborator Steve Paxton already lived.

Forti wrote about living in East Charleston in "About the News Animations", an essay in the book Jeremiah Day/Simone Forti (2009, Project Press): "When I moved to rural Vermont, my impressions of the news began to mix together with impressions of the Milky Way and of bear tracks along the brook. The richly physical activity of gardening encourages daydream speculations and I was fascinated with the strategies of certain plants, especially the herbs, to take over their neighbors' territories." Forti lived at Mad Brook Farm for ten years, while also traveling to teach and perform. At Mad Brook Farm, Forti developed the group performance piece Green Mountain with her ensemble, Simone Forti & Troupe, which was performed at the Dance Theater Workshop in New York, NY, in 1988.

=== Further Work in Los Angeles ===
After living at Mad Brook Farm for ten years, Forti returned to Los Angeles in 1998 to be with and help care for her mother Milka. That same year, Forti began a 17-year teaching career in the UCLA Department of World Arts and Cultures, which included courses Beginning Improvisation, Advanced Improvisation, Advanced Choreography, and Advanced Interdisciplinary Composition.

Forti also taught a series of "Movement/Language" workshops at the Church In Ocean Park in Santa Monica, and invited a nucleus of students that attended those workshops to perform a dance improv piece (Open Air Improvisation) with her at the Beyond Baroque Literary Arts Center in 2002, calling the ensemble of dancers "5".

After this 2002 performance, Forti began attending workshops and giving performances and readings at Beyond Baroque, and developed a friendship and working relationship with writer/editor Fred Dewey, Beyond Baroque's Director at the time. In 2003, Dewey edited and published Forti's book Oh, Tongue on Beyond Baroque's publishing imprint, Beyond Baroque Foundation. Oh, Tongue would eventually be published in French and have 2nd and 3rd editions published in English.

In July 2005, Forti was invited to perform at the REDCAT (Roy and Edna Disney CalArts Theater) in downtown Los Angeles as part of their annual New Original Works (NOW) Festival. With collaborators writer/improv artist Terrence Luke Johnson, dancer/choreographer Sarah Swenson, and musician/composer Douglas Wadle, Forti performed the dance/theater piece Unbuttoned Sleeves. Forti, Johnson, Swenson, and Wadle called their small ensemble "The Sleeves", and collaboratively published the book Unbuttoned Sleeves on the Beyond Baroque Foundation imprint in 2006. The Sleeves created and performed four additional dance/theater pieces together around Los Angeles: "Civics 101" (2006) at Highways Performance Space, Turtles All The Way Down at The Unknown Theater (2007), To Borrow Salt (2009) at The Box Gallery Chinatown, and Conversation Piece (2010) at Highways Performance Space.

Jeremiah Day, Fred Dewey, and Simone Forti traveled to London in May 2009 to attend and perform at the book launch party for Jeremiah Day/Simone Forti (2009, Project Press), a book that was developed from the exhibition Simone Forti/Jeremiah Day "News Animations"/"No Words For You, Springfield'", which ran from March 27 to May 3, 2008, at the Project Arts Centre in Dublin. At the launch party, Forti and Day performed a News Animation together, and Dewey gave a reading. Forti, Day, and Dewey performed and exhibited several more times together as a trio from 2009 to 2015, including at the Santa Monica Museum of Art (SMMOA) in 2014 and at Errant Bodies in Berlin, Germany, in 2012.

Dewey introduced Forti to Mara McCarthy, director of The Box L.A. gallery and daughter of artist Paul McCarthy, in 2009. Forti and McCarthy planned Forti's first exhibition at The Box L.A. that year, Work In A Range of Mediums, the opening of which was preceded by a performance of To Borrow Salt by The Sleeves ensemble (Forti, Terrence Luke Johnson, Sarah Swenson, and Douglas Wadle). Forti was represented by The Box L.A. from 2009 to 2026, and had several solo exhibitions and performances there. In June 2026, The Box L.A. closed and Forti began to be represented by Galleria Raffaella Cortese in Milan, Italy.

Forti's first large-scale career retrospective exhibition took place in 2014 at the Museum der Moderne in Salzburg, Austria. An accompanying catalogue, Simone Forti: Thinking with the Body, with essays by Yvonne Rainer, Steve Paxton, Fred Dewey, Robert Morris, curator Sabine Breitwieser, Meredith Morse, and Julia Bryan-Wilson, was published in 2014 by Hirmer.

In December 2015, the Museum of Modern Art, Department of Media and Performance Art acquired Forti's group of nine pieces known as the Dance Constructions.

== Death ==
On July 29, 2026, it was announced that Simone Forti had died in Los Angeles at the age of 91.

== Awards and achievements ==
- 1976 – New York State Council on the Arts (NYSCA) CAPS Grant
- 1976 – U.S. National Endowment for the Arts (NEA) Grant for Choreography
- 1980 – U.S. National Endowment for the Arts (NEA) Choreographer's Fellowship
- 1985 – Australia Council Theatre Board Award
- 1988 – New York State Council on the Arts (NYSCA) Grant for Choreography
- 1995 – Dance Theater Workshop's New York Dance and Performance Award (also known as the "Bessie" Award) for Sustained Achievement
- 2003 – Lester Horton Lifetime Achievement Award presented by the Dance Resource Center of Los Angeles
- 2005 – John Simon Guggenheim Memorial Foundation Fellowship: Creative Arts - Choreography
- 2008 – Choreographers in Mentorship and Exchange (CHIME) Grant, Los Angeles
- 2011 – Yoko Ono Lennon Courage Award for the Arts
- 2015 – Anonymous Was A Woman Award
- 2023 – Golden Lion at Venice Biennale for lifetime achievement in the field of dance

== Works ==
1960: See Saw, Rollers (alternatively titled as Roller Boxes), Demon

1961: Slant Board, Huddle, Hangers, Platforms, Accompaniment for La Monte's 2 sounds and La Monte's 2 sounds, From Instructions, Censor, Herding, Paper Demon

1967: Face Tunes, Cloths, Elevation Tune No. 2, Song, Two At Once, Bottom

1968: Book, Fallers, Sleep Walkers (alternatively titled as Sleepwalkers or Zoo Mantras), Largo Argentina (video), Grizzly Bears (video)

1969: Throat Dance

1970: Scramble

1971: Buzzing, Illuminations (performed with Charlemagne Palestine), Folk Dance, Hippie Gospel Songs

1972: Crawling

1974: Bird's Dance Studies, Numbers

1975: Big Room (performed with Peter Van Riper), Red Green, Zero (performed with Terry O'Reilly and Pooh Kaye)

1976: Planet, Angel (integral hologram), Some Images (multimedia installation), Crawling With Stories, Fan Dance, Green Green, Tokyo Dance Festival (video) This (video)

1977

- Paper Piece
- Two Inches
- Statues (video: Anne Tardos)
- Sound and Movement (performed with Peter Van Riper)
- Performance Number Nine (performed with Peter Van Riper)
- Movements (integral hologram)
- For You (performed with Terry O'Reilly and Peter Van Riper)
- Striding/Crawling (integral hologram)
- Figure 8 (integral hologram)
- Planet in Retrograde (integral hologram)
- Dancer (integral hologram)
- Harmonics (integral hologram)
- Huddle (integral hologram)
- Bug Jump (integral hologram)

1978

- Banking (alternatively titled Bicycles)
- Garden
- Circling I/II
- Fountain
- Phoenix
- Waking the Forest (alternatively titled Molimo)

1979

- Home Base
- New Dance/New Music (performed with Peter Van Riper)
- Proceeding
- Estuary: A Nature Fantasy
- Umi Aui Owe (performed with Peter Van Riper)
- Day Night
- Six
- Twig
- Turning in Place
- Crescent Roll

1981

- Jackdaw Songs (performed with Peter Van Riper and Steve Paxton)

1982

- Door Studies
- Asymmetry 222 (performed with Steve Paxton)

1983

- Spring (performed with Susan Rethorst and Z'EV)
- Board Game/Animal Stories (collaboration with Susan Rethorst)

1984

- Full Moves
- 180 Degrees (collaboration with Joan Logue and composer Tod Machover)
- Face
- Night Walk

1986

- Logomotion
- News Animations
- The Foothills (Simone Forti & Troupe performance)
- Roadcut (Simone Forti & Troupe performance)
- News Animation: Mad Brook Farm (video)

1988

- Green Mountain (Simone Forti & Troupe performance)

1989

- Touch
- Dive In

1990

- Animation

1991

- To Be Continued
- Still Life

1996

- Still Life With Framing Music

1998

- Small Dance for Big Music (performed with Charlemagne Palestine)

2000

- Binding (performed with Eric Schofer)
- Turtles, Interlude, Larousse (performed with Claire Filmon and Carmela Hermann)
- Tree Improvisation (video)

2002

- Open Air Improvisation (performed with members of "5" group – Jeremiah Day, Carmela Hermann, Lisa Bruno, Dana Hirsch, and Simone Forti.)
- Be Orators (performed with Tom Young)
- Oh, Langue (performed with Claire Filmon, Karim Zabar, Said Si Mohammed, Garrett List)
- War & Variations (performed with Terrence Luke Johnson and Dale Eunson)

2003

- Structured Improvisation (performed with Eric Schoefer and Leah Stein)

2005

- Deep Feelers (performed with Pauline Oliveros and the Brooklyn Adult Recorder Choir (BARC)
- Unbuttoned Sleeves (performing as The Sleeves, with Simone Forti, Terence Luke Johnson, Sarah Swenson, and Douglas Wadle)

2006

- Civics 101 (performing as The Sleeves, with Simone Forti, Terence Luke Johnson, Sarah Swenson, and Douglas Wadle)

2007

- Turtles All The Way Down (performing as The Sleeves, with Simone Forti, Terence Luke Johnson, Sarah Swenson, and Douglas Wadle)

2009

- To Borrow Salt (performing as The Sleeves, with Simone Forti, Terence Luke Johnson, Sarah Swenson, and Douglas Wadle)

2010

- Conversation Piece (performing as The Sleeves, with Simone Forti, Terence Luke Johnson, Sarah Swenson, and Douglas Wadle)

2012

- That Fish is Broke (performed with Terrence Luke Johnson and Brennan Gerard)

2013

- Zuma News (video)
- Nonsense (performed with Terrence Luke Johnson)

2014

- Icebergs (performed with Tashi Wada and Rae Shao-Lan)

2015

- Flag in the Water (video)
- Flowers and Vessel (performed with Oguri and Roxanne Steinberg)

2016

- Journey Dream Flower (performed with Oguri)
- A Free Consultation (video)

=== Teaching ===
- 1959–1960 Anna Halprin's Marin Dance Co-op, Marin County, CA
- 1964–1965 Temple Emanu-El School, New York, NY
- 1970–1972 California Institute for the Arts, Valencia, CA
- 1972–1974 Nova Scotia College of Art and Design, Halifax, NS
- 1974 Mount Saint University, Halifax, NS
- 1980–2014 Movement Research, New York, NY
- 1983–1987 School of Visual Arts, New York, NY
- 1987–1994 Theater School and Center for New Dance Development
- 1987–1989 American Dance Festival, Durham, NC
- 1997–2014 University of California Los Angeles, Department of World Arts and Cultures, Los Angeles, CA

=== Books by Simone Forti ===
- L'orso allo specchio. Kunstverein Publishing/Galleria Raffaella Cortese, Milano. Andrea Wiarda, Roos Gortzak, Editors. Translated by Andrea di Serego Alighieri. 2020.
- The Bear In The Mirror. Walther König, Köln. Quinn Latimer, Roos Gortzak, Editors. 2018.
- Ed. Dewey, Fred. Oh Tongue (2nd ed.). Venice, CA: Beyond Baroque Foundation. 2010.
- With Day, Jeremiah. Simone Forti/Jeremiah Day. Venice, CA: Project Press. 2009.
- With Johnson, Terrence Luke, Sarah Swenson, and Douglas Wadle. Unbuttoned Sleeves. Venice, CA: Beyond Baroque Foundation. 2006.
- Oh, Tongue (1st ed.). Venice, CA: Beyond Baroque Foundation. 2003.
- Handbook in Motion: An Account of an Ongoing Personal Discourse and its Manifestations in Dance (3rd ed.). Vermont: self-published. 1997.
- Handbook in Motion: An Account of an Ongoing Personal Discourse and its Manifestations in Dance (2nd ed.). New York: New York University Press. 1980.
- Angel. New York: self-published. 1978.
- Handbook in Motion: An Account of an Ongoing Personal Discourse and Its Manifestations in Dance (1st ed.). Halifax, Canada: The Press of the Nova Scotia College of Art and Design. 1974.

=== Articles by Simone Forti ===
- "Artists on L.A.". Artforum. Vol. 50, No. 2, 2011.
- "The Light of the Dancing". Contact Quarterly. Vol. 34, No. 2, Summer/Fall 2009, Special Focus: Inspiration Expiration, p 17.
- "itch: writings from a Los Angeles dance journal". Contact Quarterly. Vol. 33 No. 2, Summer/Fall 2008, Special Focus: Activism & Community, p 36 - 39.
- "The Movement of Attention: An Interview with Daniel Lepkoff". Movement Research Performance Journal. No. 29, 2005, p. 8–9.
- "Years Later". Movement Research Performance Journal. No. 18, 2004, p. 18.
- "Animate Dancing: a practice in dance improvisation". Contact Quarterly. Vol. 26 No. 2, Summer/Fall 2001, p 32 - 39.
- "CI at World Tai Chi Day". Contact Quarterly. Vol. 26, No. 1, Winter/Spring 2001, Still Moving – Contact Improv. shoptalk & dialogue, p 60 - 62.
- "Young Frog Falls Over". Movement Research Performance Journal. No. 18, 1999, p. 14.
- "Interview with Nina Martin". Movement Research Performance Journal. No. 17, 1998/1999, p. 26.
- "The Feel of an Ancient Form". Contact Quarterly. Vol. 23, No. 1, Winter/Spring 1998, Contact Improvisation's 25th Anniversary Issue, p 3.
- "Reflections on the Early Days". Movement Research Performance Journal. No. 14, 1997.
- "A Family Tree Story". Movement Research Performance Journal. No. 9, 1994, p. 2.
- "Thoughts on To Be Continued: a sketch of a dance/narrative process". Contact Quarterly. Vol. 19, No. 1, Winter/Spring 1994, p 13 - 21.
- "Great Thanks Empty Words: a tribute to John Cage". Contact Quarterly. Vol. 18, No. 1, Winter/Spring 1993, p 94 - IBC.
- "Far From the Front". Movement Research Performance Journal. No. 5, 1992, p 3.
- "Organic Telling". Movement Research Performance Journal. No. 1, 1990/1991, p 10.
- "Tea for Two: A Conversation Between Simone Forti and Yvonne Rainer". Contact Quarterly. Vol. 15, No. 2, Spring/Summer 1990, Issues Issue 2, p 27 - 31.
- "Animating the News". Contact Quarterly. Vol. 15, No. 1, Winter 1990, Issues Issue 1, p 32 - 35.
- "A Few Months Ago". Contact Quarterly. Vol. 15, No. 1, Winter 1990, Issues Issue 1, p 3.
- "A Set of Notes Written in the Few Days Before and After New Year 1985". Contact Quarterly. Vol. 12, No. 1, Winter 1987, p 12 - 15.
- "Banking: Instructions for a Dance". Contact Quarterly. Vol. 11, No. 2, Spring/Summer 1986, Space/Time Issue 2, p 11 - 13.
- "Full Moves: thoughts on dance behavior". Contact Quarterly. Vol. 9, No. 3, Fall 1984, p 7 - 14.
- "Home Base". Contact Quarterly. Vol. 5 No. 3/4, Spring/Summer 1980, Focus on Sports, p 6 - 10.
- "Bicycles". Dance Scope. Fall 1978.
- "Dancing at the Fence". Avalanche. No. 10, December 1974, p. 20–23.
- "Theater and Engineering-An Experiment". Artforum. 5. February 1967.
- "5 Pieces: Dance Report, Dance Report, Dance Construction, Dance Construction, Instructions for a Dance". In An Anthology of Chance Operations... Eds. Young, La Monte, and Jackson Mac Low. New York: Something Else Press, 1963.
