= Ann Hunter Popkin =

- Born: 1945 (age 80–81)
- Occupation: Teacher, activist
- Education: Radcliffe College; Brandeis University

Ann Hunter Popkin (born 1945) is a long-time social justice and women's movement activist. As a northern college student she traveled to Mississippi to participate in Freedom Summer in 1964. She was a founding member of Bread and Roses, a women's liberation organization in Cambridge, Massachusetts, in 1969, and produced the first scholarly study of its appeal and impact. A photographer, film-maker, teacher, and counselor, Popkin has worked in a variety of university and community settings.

Popkin graduated from Radcliffe College in 1967 and also attended Brandeis University from 1968 to 1977 where she earned a Ph.D. in Sociology.

== Early Movement Activism ==
Working alongside northern and southern black and white students doing voter registration canvassing and community work in Vicksburg, Mississippi in the summer of 1964 was a powerful experience that shaped Popkin's life-long commitment to social justice and anti-racism. She participated in the anti-war movement, working in 1967 as a researcher for Professor Noam Chomsky analyzing American press coverage of the Vietnam War. In 1969, she joined other women who began to expand the analysis of race and class inequality to challenge widely accepted ideas about gender inequality and to envision women's liberation. As a founding member of Bread and Roses, Popkin took part in its various collective activities, including participating in consciousness raising as well as protests exposing and criticizing sexism, and marching as part of women's contingents at anti-war and civil rights protests and demonstrations. Into the mid 1970s, Being part of women's liberation was another formative and continuing influence on Popkin's life and work. She taught courses on the women's movement at a Boston-area Women's School, and was also active in the New England Marxist-Feminist Study Group and the Boston Women's Union.

== University and Community Teaching and Anti-Racist Work ==
Starting in 1973, Popkin taught courses on the Sociology of Men and Women, Social Movements, Media and Society, and Unlearning Racism and Sexism at the University of Massachusetts Boston, the University of California, Santa Cruz, the University of Oregon, where she was the acting director of women's studies, and at Oregon State, where she was the Acting Director of the Differences, Power and Discrimination Program. In 2003 Popkin received a Women of Achievement Award from Oregon State. Beginning in 1983, Popkin also served as a leader and facilitator for community-based Unlearning Racism and Sexism Workshops in the Bay Area, California and in Eugene, Oregon. She currently leads Compassionate Listening Training and Practice Groups in Portland, Oregon.

== Scholarship and Publications ==
- Ann Hunter Popkin, "Bread and Roses: An Early Moment in the Development of Socialist-Feminism," PhD Dissertation in Sociology, Brandeis University, 1978
- Linda Gordon and Ann Popkin, "Women's Liberation: Let Us All Now Emulate Each Other," in Seasons of Rebellion: Protest and Radicalism in Recent America, ed. Joseph Boskin and Robert Rosenstone (NY: Holt, Rinehart and Winston, 1972) pp. 286–312.
- Ann Popkin, "The Personal is Political: The Women's Liberation Movement," in They Should Have Served That Cup of Coffee, ed. Dick Cluster (Boston: South End Press, 1979), pp. 181–222
- Ann Popkin, "An Early Moment in Women's Liberation," Radical America, Vol. 22, No. 1, January–February, 1988
- Ann Popkin, "The Social Experience of Bread and Roses: Building a Community and Creating a Culture," in Women, Class and the Feminist Imagination, ed Karen V. Hansen and Ilene J. Philipson (Philadelphia: Temple University Press, 1990)
- Ann Popkin and Susan Shaw, "Teaching Teachers to Transgress," Teaching for Change: The Difference, Power and Discrimination Model, ed. Jun Xing, Judith Li, Larry Roper, and Susan Shaw (CA Lexington Press, 2007), pp. 66–110

== Photography and Film ==
Ann Popkin's photographs have been published in various editions of Our Bodies, Ourselves between 1972 and 1998, Ourselves and Our Children, 1978, and in the Boston Globe Sunday magazine, 1973.

Her documentary films include "Grandma," the life of an older woman as working wife and mother, 16mm, black and white, and Charm School, one aspect of female socialization, Super 8mm, color.
