= Norma Meras Swenson =

American activist (1932–2025)

Norma Swenson
- Born: Norma Lucille Meras; February 2, 1932; Exeter, New Hampshire, U.S.
- Died: May 11, 2025 (aged 93); Newton, Massachusetts, U.S.
- Education: Tufts University; Harvard School of Public Health
- Occupations: Activist, sociologist
- Known for: Co-founder of Boston Women's Health Book Collective (BWHBC)
- Spouse: John Swenson (m. 1956; died 2002)
- Children: Sarah Swenson

Norma Lucille Meras Swenson (née Meras; February 2, 1932 – May 11, 2025) was an American activist, a medical sociologist, and a leader in the developing woman's health movement in the United States. She co-founded the Boston Women's Health Book Collective (BWHBC), and co-authored with the Collective, Our Bodies, Ourselves (OBOS), and served as president of the OBOS nonprofit organization for several years. Swenson was OBOS's first Director of International Programs, which supported the translation and/or adaptation and dissemination of the book into more than 30 languages. Through her life, she continued to provide support to women's groups and maternal health clinics by assisting women-led organizations that work for social change in maternity care, in reproductive justice, and in healthcare-related human rights. OBOS has impacted women's health in Africa, Asia, Latin America, Europe, the United States and Canada. Swenson consulted national governments, private foundations and organizations, including the World Health Organization.

Swenson's papers are a part of the Records of the Boston Women's Health Book Collective collection at the Schlesinger Library at Harvard University.

== Early life and education ==
Swenson was born in Exeter, New Hampshire on February 2, 1932. She graduated from the Girls' Latin School, now called the Boston Latin Academy, in 1949. A graduate of Tufts University, Swenson studied medical sociology, and subsequently won a Danforth Foundation Fellowship to work with the medical sociologist Irving Zola at Brandeis University. Swenson earned an M.P.H. (Master of Public Health) from the Harvard School of Public Health (HSPH).

== Career ==
Swenson's career in Public Health focused on the improvement of women's health care through education and global community organization to provide equal health care for women. She believed that education is the key to breaking down walls of inequality. Her reform efforts in maternal healthcare began in the 1960s at the Boston Association for Childbirth Education, of which she was past president, and carried throughout her career. After stepping down as president, she continued to serve on the board. Swenson also served as the President of the International Association for Childbirth Education. In the 1980s, Swenson served on the board of the National Women's Health Collective.

After receiving her Master of Public Health degree, Swenson taught medical and graduate students about health, gender and sexuality in her course “Women, Health, and Development From a Global Perspective" in the Social and Behavioral Sciences Departments at HSPH for over 20 years. At Harvard, she served on the HSPH Alumni Council, and was a founding member and former faculty in the concentration on women, gender, and health.

Swenson was an Affiliate of the Women Gender & Sexuality program at Harvard's Faculty of Arts & Sciences, and a member of the group on Reproductive Health and Rights at the Harvard Center for Population and Development Studies. She co-taught an interdisciplinary course, Gender, Health and Marginalization Through a Critical Feminist Lens, at Massachusetts Institute of Technology (MIT)'s Graduate Consortium of Women's Studies, free on OpenCourseWare.

== Our Bodies, Ourselves ==
In the late 1960s and early 1970s, a time when women were meeting in groups across the country to share and expose injustices in their lives, Swenson and Nancy Miriam Hawley, a social worker, began meeting at their kitchen tables in Boston with other women about their health, their experiences with healthcare, questions about sexuality and their bodies, only to discover that many of them shared similar frustrations and misinformation. The group grew to 12 women who spent an entire summer researching the answers to the list of medical questions they developed. They were inspired to share their research findings in a 193-page booklet, published by New England Free Press, and a course called Women and Their Bodies, which led directly to the first commercial edition of Our Bodies, Ourselves in 1971, published by Random House, with later editions by Simon & Schuster.

Swenson also utilized her knowledge on topics such as sexuality, childbirth, menopause, housing, work, retirement, money, care giving, medical problems, and death, to contribute to books such as Ourselves, Growing Older (viewed from the perspective of the older woman in OBOS). In addition to Our Bodies, Ourselves, she contributed to editions of the Boston Women's Health Book Collective's other publications including guide for aging women: Ourselves Growing Older: Women Aging with Knowledge and Power.

== She's Beautiful When She's Angry ==
The film She's Beautiful When She's Angry explains the history of the women who founded the modern women's movement from 1966 to 1971. The movie moves from the founding of NOW, with women in hats and gloves, to the beginning of more radical groups of women's liberation. She's Beautiful When She's Angry articulates the stories of 30 individual women and the Our Bodies Ourselves collective, all of which fought for their own equality and in the process created a revolution. Created by filmmaker Mary Dore, She's Beautiful When She's Angry is the first film about second-wave feminism to illustrate clearly the distinctions between what became the global women's health movement and how, as a movement, OBOS was closer to the heart of women's liberation than to mainstream feminism at the time. Rather than celebrating "girl power," Dore illustrates an honest, critical, and inclusive image of the history of second wave feminism. "It explains the place of Our Bodies, Ourselves in providing a feminist guide to women's health and medical care, while providing a bibliography for who was organizing and how to organize for both local and national change."

Swenson's mother was eight years old when women won the right to vote and electricity came to the immigrant farming community where she was born. By the time Swenson became a mother, she was president of a women's rights organization. Swenson felt that "one of the high points of She’s Beautiful When She’s Angry is the tribute paid and the link made to that first wave, which started with such a sweeping agenda and ended after less than a century with the single, narrow goal of giving women the right to vote."

== Personal life and death ==
In 1956, she married World War II airman John Lena Swenson of the 100th Bomb Group of the Eighth Air Force. He died in 2002. They had one daughter, Sarah Vox Swenson, who became a well-known choreographer.

Swenson died from cancer at her home in Newton, Massachusetts, on May 11, 2025, at the age of 93. The Our Bodies Ourselves project posted an obituary on its website.
