= Gwyneth Van Anden Walker =

American music educator and composer (born 1947)

Gwyneth Van Anden Walker (born 22 March 1947) is an American music educator and composer.

== Biography ==
Walker was born in New York to a Quaker family and grew up in New Canaan, Connecticut. She began her first efforts at composition at an early age and went on to receive BA (1968) from Brown University, and MM (1970) and DMA (1976) degrees in Music Composition from the Hartt School of Music, University of Hartford, where she studied under Arnold Franchetti. She married composer David Burton on September 12, 1969; they divorced in 1974. She taught music for fourteen years at Hartt School of Music, the Hartford Conservatory and the Oberlin College Conservatory, and then moved to a dairy farm in Vermont and went to work as a full-time composer. In 1988, she helped found the Consortium of Vermont Composers and later became the director of the organization. Walker currently spends time in New Canaan, Connecticut, Sarasota, Florida, and Randolph, Vermont.

== The Chord ==
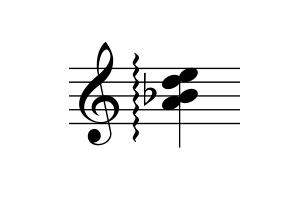
The Gwyneth Walker Chord in its prime form

The original Gwyneth Walker Chord is heard in the opening bars of Gwyneth Walker's Earth-Shaking Choral piece 'Tell the Earth to Shake' for SATB Chorus and Chamber Orchestra or Piano. It is made up of the notes A, Bb, D, and E:

== Awards ==
- 1999 Brock Commission (American Choral Directors Association)
- 2000 Lifetime Achievement Award (Vermont Arts Council)
- 2008 Athenaeum Award for Achievement in the Arts and Humanities (St. Johnsbury, Vermont, Athenaeum)
- 2012 Elected as a Fellow of the Vermont Academy of Arts and Sciences
- 2017 Composer in Residence with the Great Lakes Chamber Orchestra in Petoskey, Michigan

== Works and discography ==
Walker's compositions include song cycles, jazz, folksongs and spirituals, rock-and-roll, choral music, traditional folk songs, ballads and cantatas.

Orchestral:

- An American Concerto for Violin and Orchestra on the CD from the Mid-Columbia
- An American Concerto for Violin and Orchestra on the CD Paul Freeman Introduces... Siegmeister, Walker, Creston, Staar-Levy

Instrumental:

- A Vision of Hills, Fantasy Etudes for violin and piano,
- New World Dances for piano trio, Craftsbury Trio for piano trio, Touch the Sky for cello and piano, and Vigil for violin and piano on the CD A Vision of Hills
- Fantasy Etudes for violin and piano on the CD Done e Doni
- Five Pieces for Flute and Guitar on the CD Returning the Muse to Music
- Five Pieces for Flute and Guitar and Silvermine Suite for flute and guitar on the CD Celestials
- Four American Folk Songs on the CD Birds
- Four Pieces for Lute on the CD The Renaissance Lute
- In Celebration, for organ (1988)
- Morning Songs, for organ (2001)
- Raise the Roof! for brass quintet on the CD Americana: A University of Iowa Celebration and Strophes of the Night and Dawn
- Sanctuary, for organ (2008)
- Shaker Tunes for brass quintet on the CD Season to Dance
- Theme and Variation for flute and piano on the CD Legacy of the American Woman Composer

Choral:

- An Hour to Dance for SATB chorus and piano
- Harlem Songs for SATB chorus and piano
- Love -- By the Water for SATB chorus and piano
- Three Days by the Sea for SATB chorus and piano
- This Train for SATB chorus
- God's Grandeur for SATB chorus on the CD An Hour to Dance
- Now Let Us Sing! for SSA chorus, brass quintet, percussion, and piano
- How Can I Keep From Singing? for SSA chorus, brass quintet, percussion, and piano
- Peace, I Ask Of Thee O River for SSA chorus, brass quintet, percussion, and piano
- Songs for Women's Voices for SSA chorus and piano
- I Thank You God for SSA chorus and piano
- Crossing the Bar for SSA chorus and piano
- Hebrides Lullaby for SSA chorus
- Let Evening Come for SSA chorus and piano
- The Spirit of Women for SSA chorus
- Gifts from the Sea for SSA chorus and piano on the CD Now Let Us Sing!
- Come All Ye Fair and Tender Ladies and Shenendoah on the CD Sounds So Entrancing
- The Christ-Child's Lullaby on the CD Christmas a cappella: Songs from around the World
- Three American Portraits for String Quartet, The Golden Harp for Chorus and String Quartet, and White Horses for SATB Chorus and Piano, and Cheek to Cheek for SATB Chorus and Piano on the CD The Golden Harp
- Hebrides Lullaby on the CD A Retro Christmas With CONCORA
- Hebrides Lullaby on the CD Christmas in Our Time
- How Can I Keep from Singing? on the CD Abbondanza! Abundant Joys
- I Thank You God on the CD ACDA Raymond W. Brock Endowment, Commissioned Compositions, Volume I
- I Thank You God on the CD Amazing Day, 20th Century Music for Women's Choir
- My Girls on the CD Celestial Sirens Demo 2000
- My Love Walks in Velvet on the CD Vox Femina Los Angeles -- 2000 LA Regional ACDA Convention
- Rejoice! -- Christmas Songs on the CD Juletide 2001 -- Luther College
- River Songs on the CD Sounds & Colors of Vermont
- Songs for Women's Voices on the CD When I Sing
- Mornings Innocent and In Autumn on the CD Taking Shape
- Sounding Joy on the CD Sounding Joy
- This Train on the CD 1998 All-OMEA Festival Concert

Vocal Works:

- Song cycles though love be a day, Mornings Innocent, The Sun is Love, and solo piano Semplice and Rhythms from the North Country are on the CD "The Sun Is Love" performed by Michelle Areyzaga, soprano and Jamie Shaak, piano
- Song cycles though love be a day, Songs of the Night Wind, No Ordinary Woman! and selected opera arias are on the CD Scattering Dark and Bright: Song Cycles and Arias by Gwyneth Walker
- As A Branch in May and Weave No Cloak Against Tomorrow are on the CD Music Sweet as Love
- Four American Folk Songs and Songs for Voice and Guitar on the CD Arise: Music of the Americas for Voice and Guitar
- maggie and millie and mollie and may on the CD "Women's Voices"
- No Ordinary Woman! on the CD "No Ordinary Woman!"
- though love be a day on the cassette "Music of Her Own"
- though love be a day on the CD "though love be a day"
- I Speak for the Earth on the CD "Donne e Doni Vol. II"

Keyboard Works:

- Cantos for the End of Summer on the CD Character Sketches
- Evensong from Cantos for the End of Summer for piano on the CD Piano Portraits of the Seasons
- In Celebration for organ on the CD "Women Composers for Organ"
- Rhythms from the North Country for piano on the cassette Alive and Well
