= Women's Community Health Center =

The Women's Community Health Center (WCHC) in Cambridge, Massachusetts, was founded and owned by women from a wide range of backgrounds that provided a variety of health care procedures for women. The center opened in 1974 on 173 Hampshire Street, Cambridge, Massachusetts, with the creators Jennifer Burgess and Cookie Avrin as well as with many other feminists to provide low-cost health care for women. With the help of the creators of Our Bodies Ourselves, The Boston Women's Health Collective, they were able to receive a $5,000 grant. The center initially provided gynecological services and self-help sessions but later were able to perform abortions. Author Sandra Morgen believes that feminist health care centers such as the WCHC arose with the intention to challenge the male-dominated field and to create a space where women had control over their own health care.

== History ==
In 1975, the WCHC began a long process to get their official clinical license. The center was functional with just the license of their doctors, but a license was required to accept Medicaid. They faced several building inspections, zoning issues, and had to resubmit lost paperwork. A state committee soon questioned whether or not the WCHC should be allowed to provide medical services before being licensed. In response, the center fought back with ads and were given a deadline to finish the licensing process by the state. Eventually, the WCHC moved buildings in 1978 and received their license. The staff believed that this lengthy process conveyed how officials used rules to target the center because of how it challenged traditional medicine.

The work done in this center is a distinct form of grassroot activism in the second wave and differed from the predominantly male medical field. As shown in a study done by the AAMC, only 24.9% of medical school students in the US were female from 1980-1981. Although the WCHC's work was highly influential, the WCHC eventually shut down in 1981 due to inadequate income.

== Health services ==
The WCHC offered many services including screenings, self-help programs, and later, on abortions. They are most known for their self-help programs, which included various topics such as menopause, lesbian health, herbal medicine, and natural birth control. The staff gave presentations and made videos to teach women about health care and self-exams. Inside the center they also had a library, which offered health fact sheets in Spanish and Portuguese. The WCHC also hosted Women's Health Weekends with the Cambridge YMCA.

== Pelvic training program ==
The Pelvic Training Program, also known as PTP, was an innovative program that changed the way pelvic exams had been done by "transforming the model 'patient' into the instructor.". The WCHC had noticed a large number of female students at Harvard Medical School that were disappointed with the gynecological training they had received, and this program wanted to change that. Within this program were 3 different protocols, each containing different approaches to teaching pelvic exams for Harvard medical students.

=== Protocol #1 ===
In this protocol, the pelvic teaching models participating in the program would be paid $25 per session. During each session, groups of four to five medical students practiced giving pelvic exams to the model under the supervision of a Harvard instructor. This protocol was unsuccessful, as models thought they were underpaid and felt exploited.

=== Protocol #2 ===
Protocol #2 required five staff members of the WCHC to be at the scene and six affiliated women to be instructors of the program. Each session paid $50 per session for the models and involved groups of five students, with at least one required to be female. Their goal was to make the models feel more comfortable while being examined. The students were required to read a manual created by the WCHC before attending a session. This protocol was deemed "most effective" of them all.

=== Protocol #3 ===
The final protocol was rejected by Harvard Medical School, as the program was limited to only female participants and required a $750 fee. Many people found this protocol to be regressive rather than progressive, as one medical director stated, "this diminishes the chances of helping male physicians to become aware of women's health needs from the woman's viewpoint.". Now that there were no male students in the program, many people thought the program lost one if its main purposes. This was the final protocol of the PTP.

== Impact ==
Although the Women's Community Health Center closed in 1981, the work done in this establishment had long lasting impacts in the medical world. Morgen conveys that that feminist health centers like the WCHC helped restructure women's roles in the medical field by training female health workers and transforming patient education into care. Many of the founders used the center as a space to educate women about their bodies, reshape medical training in gynecological care, and extending their ideas and practices into other clinics and health programs, which continue to appear in other health centers.
