= Ernestine Rose =

American social activist (1810–1892)

- Born: Ernestine Louise Polowsky; January 13, 1810; Piotrków Trybunalski, Duchy of Warsaw (now Poland)
- Died: August 4, 1892 (aged 82); Brighton, England
- Resting place: Highgate Cemetery, London, England
- Other name: Ernestine Louise Polowsky
- Occupation: Manufacturer of perfumed paper
- Known for: Women's rights; Women's suffrage; Feminism; Civil rights; Atheist feminism
- Spouse: William Ella Rose

Ernestine Louise Rose (January 13, 1810 – August 4, 1892) was a suffragist, abolitionist, and freethinker who has been called the "first Jewish feminist." Her career spanned from the 1830s to the 1870s, making her a contemporary to the more famous suffragists Elizabeth Cady Stanton and Susan B. Anthony. Largely forgotten in contemporary discussions of the American women's rights movement, she was one of its major intellectual forces in nineteenth-century America. The quote, "women's rights are human rights," was believed to be coined by her. Her relationship with Judaism is a debated motivation for her advocacy. As a rabbi's daughter, Ernestine had received more education than other women her age. Although less well remembered than her fellow suffragists and abolitionists, in 1996, she was inducted into the National Women's Hall of Fame, and in 1998 the Ernestine Rose Society was founded to "revive the legacy of this important early nineteenth century reformer by recognizing her pioneering role in the first wave of feminism."

== Early life ==
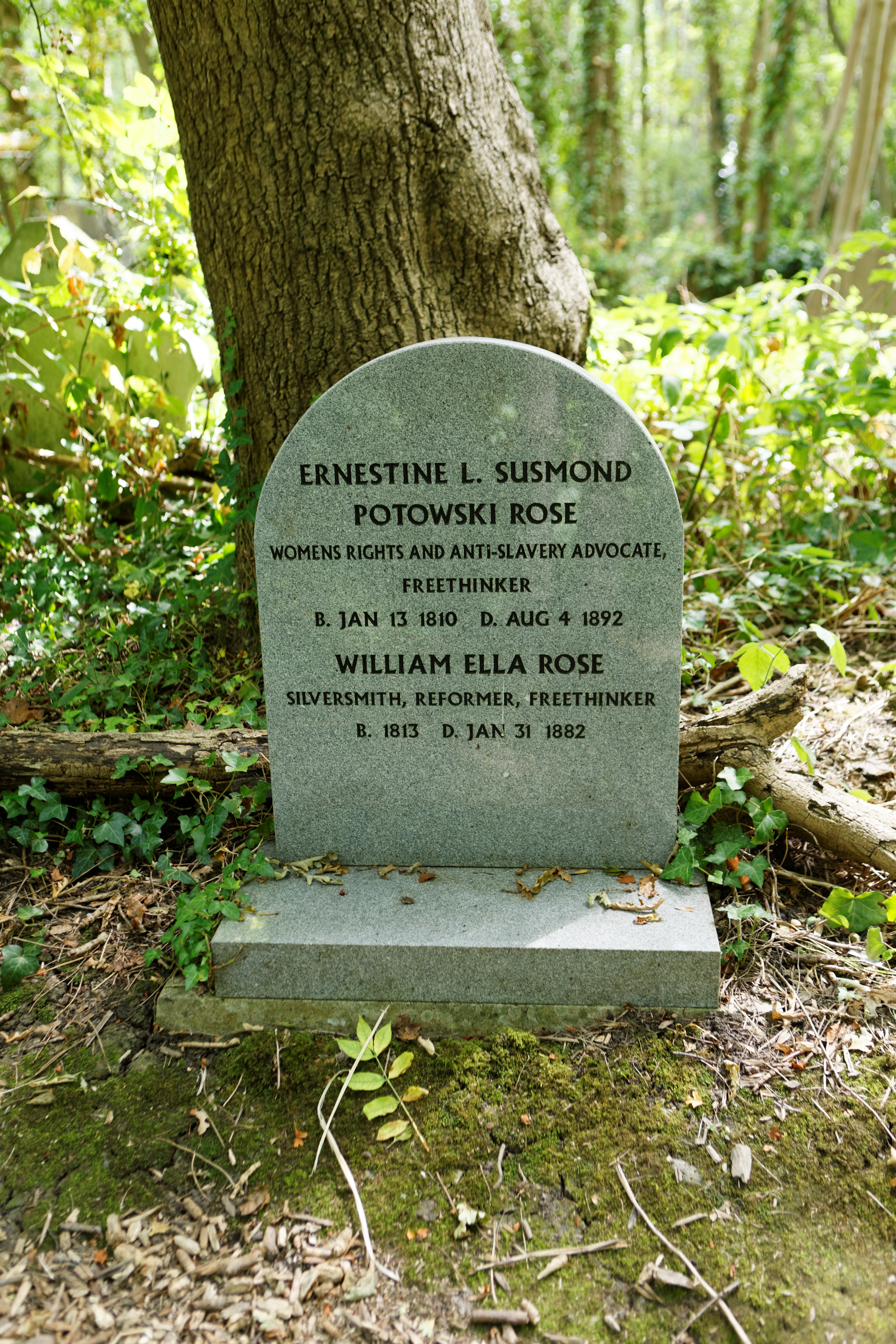
Rose's grave in Highgate Cemetery

She was born on 13 January 1810 in Piotrków Trybunalski, Duchy of Warsaw, as Ernestine Louise Susmond Potowsky. (Note: According to Anderson (2017), "Ernestyna" is a Polish name and she seems to have been called this during her early teenage years. "Louise" was a popular German name in this period, used to honour Queen of Prussia, who shortly before Ernestine's birth had pleaded for her nation with its conqueror, Napoleon. "Susmond," a Germanic surname, may have been Ernestine's mother's maiden name. In the United States, Polish names are ungendered and always used in the masculine form, like "Potowsky" or "Potowski." But in Poland, last names are gendered and Ernestine and her mother would have been called "Potowska". As a married woman, Ernestine Rose completely dropped her maiden last names and used the middle initial "L." for Louise.) Her father was a rabbi; her mother was the daughter of a wealthy businessman. Unusually for the time, she was educated and learned Hebrew. At the age of five, Rose began to "question the justice of a God who would exact such hardships" as the frequent fasts that her father performed. "I was a rebel at the age of five." As she grew older, she began to question her father more and more on religious matters. He told her, "A young girl does not want to understand the object of her creed, but to accept and believe it." She later said that she dated her disbelief and women's rights principles from that event.

When she was sixteen her mother died and left her an inheritance. Her father, without her consent, betrothed her to a Jewish friend of his, to "bind her more closely to the bosom of the synagogue." Rose, not wanting to enter a marriage with a man she neither chose nor loved, confronted him, professing her lack of affection towards him and begging for release. However, Rose was a woman from a rich family, and he denied her plea. In a highly unusual move, Rose traveled to the secular civil court — a difficult trip in winter — where she pleaded her case herself. The court ruled in her favor, not only freeing her from her betrothal, but ruling that she could retain the full inheritance she received from her mother. Although she decided to relinquish the fortune to her father, she gladly took her freedom from betrothal. She returned home only to discover that in her absence her father had remarried, to a sixteen-year-old girl. The tension that developed eventually forced her to leave home at the age of seventeen.

Rose then traveled to Berlin, where she found herself hampered by an antisemitic law that required all non-Prussian Jews to have a Prussian sponsor. She appealed directly to the king and was granted an exemption from the rule. Soon afterward, she invented perfumed paper for use as a room deodorizer, which she sold to fund her travels.

== England and the United States ==
She traveled to Belgium, the Netherlands, France, and finally England. Her arrival in England was less than smooth, however, as the ship in which she was sailing was shipwrecked. Although Rose did make it to England safely, all her possessions had been destroyed, and she found herself destitute. In order to support herself, she sought work teaching German and Hebrew; she also continued to sell her perfumed paper. While in England, she met Robert Owen, a Utopian socialist, who was so impressed by her that he invited her to speak in a large hall for radical speakers. In spite of her limited knowledge of English, the audience was so impressed that from then on her appearances were regular. She and Owen were close friends, and she even helped him to found the Association of All Classes of All Nations, a group that espoused human rights for all people of all nations, sexes, races, and classes. He called her "his daughter." During her time there she also met William Ella Rose, a Christian jeweler and silversmith, an Englishman, and a "fervent disciple" of Owen. They were soon married by a civil magistrate, and both made it plain that they considered the marriage a civil contract rather than a religious one.

In May 1836 the Roses emigrated to the United States, where they later became naturalized citizens and settled in a house in New York City in 1837. The Roses soon opened a small "Fancy and Perfumery" store in their home, where Rose sold her perfumed toilet water and William ran a silversmith shop.

== Abolitionist, atheist, feminist, suffragist ==
Rose soon began to give lectures on the subjects that most interested her, joining the "Society for Moral Philanthropists" and traveling to different states to espouse her causes: the abolition of slavery, religious tolerance, public education, and equality for women. Her lectures were met with controversy. When she was in the South to speak out against slavery, one slaveholder told her he would have "tarred and feathered her if she had been a man." When, in 1855, she was invited to deliver an anti-slavery lecture in Bangor, Maine, a local newspaper called her "a female Atheist... a thousand times below a prostitute." When Rose responded to the slur in a letter to the competing paper, she sparked off a town feud that created such publicity that, by the time she arrived, everyone in town was eager to hear her. Her most ill-received lecture was likely in Charleston, West Virginia, where her lecture on the evils of slavery was met with such vehement opposition and outrage that she was forced to exercise considerable influence to get out of the city safely.

In the 1840s and 1850s, Rose joined the "pantheon of great American women," a group that included such influential women as Elizabeth Cady Stanton, Susan B. Anthony, Lucretia Mott, Paulina Kellogg Wright Davis, and Sojourner Truth, along with William Lloyd Garrison and Frederick Douglass, to fight for women's rights and abolition.

In the winter of 1836, Judge Thomas Hertell submitted a married women's property act to the New York State Legislature to investigate methods of improving the civil and property rights of married women, and to allow them to hold real estate in their own name. When Rose heard of this resolution, she drew up a petition and began to solicit names in support of it. In 1838, this petition was sent to the state legislature in spite of having five signatures. This was the first petition ever introduced in favor of rights for women. During the following years, she increased both the number of petitions and the number of signatures. In 1849, these rights were finally won.

Rose also attended and spoke at numerous conferences and conventions, including, but not limited to the first National Women's Rights Convention in Worcester, Massachusetts, on October 23–24, 1850, First National Convention of Infidels, the Hartford Bible Convention, the Women's Rights Convention in the Tabernacle, New York City, the tenth national convention of the National Women's Rights Convention in Cooper Institute, New York City, the State Women's Rights Convention in Albany, New York, and the Equal Rights Association meeting in which there was a schism.

Rose was elected president of the National Women's Rights Convention in October, 1854, in spite of objections that she was an atheist. Her election was heavily supported by Susan B. Anthony, who declared that "every religion – or none – should have an equal right on the platform."

Although she never seemed to attach great importance to her Jewish background, in 1863 Rose had a published debate with Horace Seaver, the abolitionist editor of the Boston Investigator, whom she accused of being antisemitic.

In 1869, she successfully lobbied for legislation in New York that allowed married women to retain their own property and have equal guardianship of children.

In her later years, after a six-month trip to Europe, she attempted to stay away from platforms and controversy. However, within 6 months, she made the closing address at the nationwide Women's Rights Convention. Her health once again took a downward turn, and on June 8, 1869, she and her husband set sail for England. Susan B. Anthony arranged a farewell party for them, and the couple received many gifts from friends and admirers, including a substantial amount of money.

After 1873, her health improved, and she began to advocate women's suffrage in England, even attending the Conference of the Woman's Suffrage Movement in London and speaking in Edinburgh, Scotland at a large public meeting in favor of woman's suffrage. She died in Brighton, England, in 1892 and was buried at Highgate Cemetery.

== Sources ==
=== Primary sources ===
- Mistress of Herself: Speeches and Letters of Ernestine Rose, Early Women's Rights Leader, Paula Doress-Worters, ed. Feminist Press, 2008, ISBN 978-1-5586-1543-4
- History of Woman Suffrage Vol 1. (Internet Archive)

=== Secondary sources ===
- Lazarus, Joyce B. (2022). Ernestine L. Rose: To Change a Nation, Hamilton Books, Lanham, Maryland, ISBN 978-0-7618-7342-6
- Jacoby, Susan (2005). Freethinkers: A History of American Secularism, "Lost Connections: Anticlericalism, Abolitionism, and Feminism." Henry Holt And Company, New York, ISBN 0-8050-7776-6
- "Great Minds - Ernestine L. Rose: Freethinking Rebel", Carol Kolmerten, Summer, 2002, (Volume 22, No. 3), p53-55, Free Inquiry
- Kolmerten, Carol (1998). The American Life of Ernestine L. Rose. Syracuse University Press, ISBN 0-8156-0528-5
- Anderson, Bonnie S. (2017) The Rabbi's Atheist Daughter: Ernestine Rose, International Feminist Pioneer. Oxford University Press, ISBN 978-0-19-975624-7
- Davin, Anna (2002). "Honouring Ernestine Rose, London, 1 and 4 August 2002". History Workshop Journal (54): 276–277. ISSN 1363-3554
