= Peter Van Riper =

American artist (1942–1998)

Peter van Riper
- Van Riper playing aluminium baseball bats in circa 1985
- Born: July 8, 1942; Detroit, Michigan, U.S.
- Died: November 18, 1998 (aged 56)
- Occupations: Artist, musician, pioneer
- Spouse(s): Simone Forti, (1974-1981)

Peter van Riper (July 8, 1942 – November 18, 1998) was an American sound and light environment artist, musician, and pioneer of laser art and holography.

== Biography ==
Van Riper was born in Detroit's Inner City, Michigan, the son of a psychoanalyst and an avid record collector. During the 1960s he received a B.A. Far Eastern History, and Art History from the University of North Carolina, Chapel Hill, graduated in Art History at Tokyo University and the University of Michigan, Ann Arbor, and took part in Fluxus performances and exhibitions in Japan. He later appeared on Tellus Audio Cassette Magazine #24 FluxTellus, Harvestworks, 1990, as part of an ensemble performing George Maciunas's Solo For Lips And Tongue. He collaborated with Fluxus members during exhibitions and performances, but Van Riper's influences are much wider. He is a true sound artist whose music is often inspired by Far Eastern traditions from Japan or Indonesia.

From 1967 to 1970, van Riper was a member of Editions Inc., an Ann Arbor, Michigan gallery of holography, animated along laser physicist Lloyd Cross and artist Jerry Pethick (1935–2003). In 1970 they organized an exhibition at the Cranbrook Academy, and at the Finch College Museum in New York. Both Cross and Pethick co-founded the School of Holography, San Francisco, California. Van Riper exhibited holograms during The Nature Of Light: Exploring Unconventional Photographic Techniques exhibition, Joyce Goldstein Gallery, New York, 1996, and also created a sound performance during the exhibition opening.

== Collaborations ==
With choreographer Simone Forti
In the late 1970s and early 1980s, Van Riper worked with dancer Simone Forti, providing lighting design and live sound accompaniment to her dance performances. An avant garde dancer and choreographer, Forti took part in some of Allan Kaprow's 1960s happenings and specialized in improvised dancing. While working with her, Van Riper mostly used soprano and sopranino saxophones but also various devices and objects or even tape music. He also moved freely around the stage and dancer.

With visual artist Eugènia Balcells

Van Riper provided what he calls Acobxcvxcvustic Metal Music and small percussion works to Barcelona video and installation artist Eugènia Balcells (born 1943), who settled in New York from 1979 to 1988. For TV Weave, an installation with TV screens first showed at Metrònom gallery, Barcelona, 1985, Peter Van Riper played chiming music from suspended aluminium baseball bats. An excerpt from aluminium baseball bats music can be found on The Aerial #4 CD. Says Balcells:

The music played by Peter Van Riper creates a tonal environment, a continuous sound created by percussion on aluminium baseball bats, cut at different lengths and suspended with cables in the space.

With performance artist Sha Sha Higby

Van Riper collaborated with yet another performance artist: Sha Sha Higby.

== Other works ==
On December 6, 1982, he performed together with Jackson Mac Low and percussionist Z'EV, during a show called Language/Theater: Language/Noise, at Martinson Hall, Public Theater, New York. That same year he was included in a collective exhibition called Young Fluxus, Artists Space gallery, New York, 1982.

He composed music for Seven Days in Space, a 90' video of NASA space exploration:

Earth, Moon, Mars and Jupiter: Video from Interplanetary Space, December 14, 1976 - January 8, 1977. The Kitchen presents an exhibition of video material collected by manned and unmanned NASA space probes to the Moon, Mars and Jupiter (Apollo, Viking and Pioneer), including on-board footage from Sky Lab and television transmissions to the Earth. This show is produced in cooperation with George Bolling.
[From The Kitchen Center for Video and Music program notes for December 1976.

== List of sound works ==
- The Simple Existence of Any One Thing, in 'Everson Video 75', Everson Museum of Art, Syracuse, NY, 1975
- Big Room for kalimba, saxophones and plastic hose (w/ Forti choreography), 1975
- Red Green (w/ Forti choreography), 1975
- Plumbing Music, tape music created for a Simone Forti choreography 'Planet', 1976
- Three From Piru for a Simone Forti choreography 'Fan Dance', 1975
- This, a 3 channel installation with book, The Kitchen, New York, NY, December 1976
- It readings for performance, The Kitchen, New York, NY, December 1976
- Art on the Beach collective exhibition, Battery Park, Lower Manhattan, NY, 1978
- Home Base for plastic hose named 'molino', moku gyo (Japanese wooden bell) and mbira (African thumb piano), for a Simone Forti choreography, The Kitchen, New york 1979
- Indian Cicle for sopranino (video performance by Eugènia Balcells), 1981
- TV Weave, for aluminium baseball bats, music for Eugènia Balcells' installation, Metrònom gallery, Barcelona, 1985
- Sound/Light for Japanese gong to an Eugènia Balcells installation, Metrònom gallery, Barcelona and Experimental Intermedia Foundation, NY, 1985
- Shadows, sound installation w/ Eugènia Balcells, Roulette, NY, 1987
- Seeing/Hearing, 1991 (w/ Forti choreography)
- Collaboration, 1991 (w/ Forti choreography)

== Recorded music ==
- Sound To Movement. New Music For Saxophones, LP, 1979 VRBLU, (A-1982-48)
- Room Space. New Music For Saxophones, LP, 1981 VRBLU (A-1982-49)
- Windows to the Sky , LP
- Music for Spaces, LP
- Indian Circle, cassette, self-release
- Direct Contact, cassette, Deep Listening Institute
- Sustainable Music, cassette, Deep Listening Institute
- Music for Spaces CD, Van Riper Editions, 1997
- Marking Time CD-ROM, in collaboration with Jerry Pethick, Kamloops Art Gallery, 1998

Appears on:

- George Maciunas Solo For Lips And Tongue, included in Tellus Audio Cassette Magazine #24 FluxTellus, Harvestworks, 1990
- Heart included in The Aerial #4 cassette & CD, What Next? label, 1991
- Acoustic Metal Music included in Anti-Disc I, 33 rpm flexi disc, Anti-Utopia, 1990
- NAP CD Connection, CD published by New Arts Program, Pennsylvania

== Personal life ==
Van Riper was married to dancer, artist, and choreographer Simone Forti.
