= Sarah Swenson =

American choreographer, dancer, and teacher

- Born: Sarah Lucille Swenson; Boston, Massachusetts
- Education: New York University (Tisch) School of the Arts, California State University, Long Beach
- Occupations: Choreographer, Dancer, Teacher, and Artistic Director
- Years active: 1986-present
- Parents: John Lena Swenson (father); Norma Meras Swenson (mother)
- Website: SarahSwensonDance.com

Sarah Swenson is an American modern dance choreographer, dancer, and teacher. She trained in early modern dance forms, and later studied postmodern dance. She began her career in the early 1980s in New York City, first as a student and later a teacher at the Alvin Ailey School, and was Rehearsal Director and Performance Coach for the Alvin Ailey Student Performance Group, for which she created her first works. She was also the Associate Artistic Director of Seraphim Dance Theatre, founded by the late Raymond C. Harris.

From 2004 to 2011, Swenson collaborated with Simone Forti later becoming a principal stager for Forti's 1960s opus Dance Constructions in 2012, and then International Performance Coordinator following their 2015 acquisition by the Museum of Modern Art. Swenson also works as a director for New York-based choreographer Heidi Latsky's On Display, a global movement installation that brings disability into public focus.

== Early life and education ==
Swenson was born in Boston, Massachusetts. She attended Newton South High School where she majored in Theater Arts. She initially studied classical ballet, and at age thirteen started attending the Jacob's Pillow School where she received her first exposure to modern dance.

She received her undergraduate education at Tisch School of the Arts before enrolling at the Alvin Ailey School where she received a Certificate of Merit in 1985. In 1997, she enrolled at California State University, where she earned a Master of Fine Arts in Dance, and was the recipient of the Graduate Dean's List Award, awarded annually to the top 1% of enrolled graduate students.

== Career ==
Swenson's performing career began as a member of the Alvin Ailey Student Performance Group or Ailey III, in 1984. Shortly after, she toured The People's Republic of China and South Korea with the Myung Sook Chun Dance Company. She was an assistant teacher in the New Visions Dance Project, a music and dance program for the visually impaired, where she met visually impaired dancer, Suleiman Rifai. In 1990, she choreographed The Road, a duet she performed with Rifai.

During the same period, Swenson worked with Kevin Iega Jeff, artistic director of Artists of Jubilation!, and performed at the Apollo Theater, New York City. She later joined her dance partner, the late Raymond C. Harris, in the creation of Seraphim Dance Theatre in 1995. Swenson spent a brief period at the Dance Institute of Washington D.C. in 1996, staging the works of former Alvin Ailey principal dancer, the late Kelvin Rotardier. Later that year, she relocated to Los Angeles, and in 1997 enrolled in graduate school at California State University, Long Beach.

In 1998, Swenson began studying with Simone Forti in Los Angeles, and in the decade that followed, she collaborated with Forti on a series of works. From 2004 to 2011, Swenson and Forti collaborated with Luke Johnson and Douglas Wadle on five evening-length works. They performed as The Sleeves in Unbuttoned Sleeves at the Redcat Theater in 2005. An anthology of the texts of this work was later published by Beyond Baroque in 2006. This was followed by Civics 101 at Highways Performance Space in 2006, Turtles All The Way Down at The Unknown Theater in 2007, To Borrow Salt in 2009 at The Box Gallery Chinatown, and Conversation Piece in 2010 at Highways Performance Space.

In 2004, Swenson set up Vox Dance Theatre, later incorporated as a non-profit in 2010. Composed solely of women, Vox Dance Theatre premiered Swenson's signature work, Fimmine, at the Toronto International Dance Festival in 2005, and has continued to perform locally and internationally, including at the REDCAT Theater, Los Angeles; Edinburgh Fringe Edinburgh, Scotland; Festival de Octubre de Baja California, Mexico; Los Angeles Dance Festival, Los Angeles; The Geffen Contemporary at MOCA, Los Angeles; FucinaSud Cultural Center, Salice Salentino, Italy; Alto Jonio Dance Festival, Calabria, Italy; Palazzo Ducale, Pavullo nel Frignano, Italy; Palazzo Baronale, Monteroni di Lecce, Italy; Ex Asilo Filangieri, Napoli, Italy, REDCAT Theater, Los Angeles, and many others.

In 2015, Swenson was commissioned by Dancing Wheels Company of Cleveland, Ohio, on the occasion of the 25th anniversary of the Americans with Disabilities Act as well as Dancing Wheels' 35th anniversary. to choreograph a new work entitled Clamor. As reported in The Plain Dealer, the show received critical acclaim.

In October 2016, she was commissioned by Vox Femina Los Angeles on the occasion of their 20th anniversary, to create Fire Within, which premiered June 10, 2017.

In 2022 she was commissioned by Partch Ensemble Los Angeles to choreograph the complete Plectra & Percussion Dances (1949–1950) by Harry Partch, which premiered on June 17, 2022, at REDCAT Theater Los Angeles.

Swenson is the principal teacher, stager and international performance coordinator for Simone Forti's Dance Constructions, acquired by the Museum of Modern Art in December 2015. She has also staged works by Rudy Perez and Viola Farber.
