= Tung Hu Ling =

Chinese martial artist (1917–1992)

Tung Hu Ling 董虎嶺
- Born: October 25, 1917; Renze (then known as Renxian), Xingtai, Hebei, China
- Died: November 29, 1992 (aged 75); Honolulu, Hawaii, U.S.
- Other names: Tung Fu Ling; Tung Huling; Tung Hu-ling
- Style: Yang-style tai chi; Wu (Hao)-style tai chi; Tung-style tai chi

Other information
- Notable relatives: Tung Ying-chieh (father)

Tung Hu Ling
- Traditional Chinese: 董虎嶺
- Simplified Chinese: 董虎岭
Transcriptions
Standard Mandarin
- Hanyu Pinyin: Dǒng Hǔlǐng
- Wade–Giles: Tung^{3} Hu^{3}-ling^{3}
Yue: Cantonese
- Jyutping: dung2 fu2 ling1

Tung Hu Ling (Chinese: 董虎嶺; pinyin: Dǒng Hǔlǐng; 1917–1992) was a Chinese and later American master of tai chi, known for teaching Yang style and Tung style, and an early leader in the spread of tai chi worldwide. Born in Renze (then known as Renxian), Xingtai, Hebei, China, his father Tung Ying-chieh was a top disciple of Yang Chengfu and famous for his fighting skills. Also highly skilled and creative himself, Tung Hu Ling taught in mainland China, Hong Kong, Macau, Southeast Asia, North America, and Europe. He then emigrated to Hawaii, founding a school in Honolulu, continued teaching workshops around the world, and carried on the Tung family legacy.

== Early life ==
Tung trained under his father Tung Ying-chieh, Yang-style Grandmaster Yang Chengfu, and several other well-known teachers, practicing the slow set for eight years, learning the sword after ten years, and the saber after fourteen, then moving on to advanced study. As an adult he taught tai chi in Hebei, Guangzhou, Shanghai, and other locations in mainland China.

Highly skilled by the age of twenty, during the Japanese occupation of China he was frequently challenged by Judo masters from Japan. He would politely decline but then accept once the challenge was repeated, and won every match while being careful not to use his full ability even when in a difficult position. This earned him much admiration and respect from his challengers as well as the Chinese martial arts community.

== Hong Kong, Macau, and Southeast Asia ==
In 1947 he moved to Hong Kong with two of his brothers, to help his father run the Tung Ying Kit Tai Chi Chuan Gymnasiums in Hong Kong and Macau. The words "Ying Kit" were based on the Cantonese pronunciation of his father's name, in which "chieh" (傑, Pinyin: jié) became "kit" (Jyutping: git6). Similarly, from that time on Tung Hu Ling's name was often written as "Tung Fu Ling", in which "Hu" (虎, Pinyin: Hǔ) became the Cantonese "Fu" (Jyutping: Fu2).

Beginning in 1953, he established branches of the Tung Ying Kit school in Thailand, Singapore, and Malaysia, and in 1956 he published a book, 太極拳使用法 (Methods of Applying Taiji Boxing; Pinyin: Tàijíquán Shǐyòngfǎ), in which his brother Tung Chun-ling (董俊嶺, Pinyin: Dǒng Jūnlǐng; 1923-1983) posed with him in photographs demonstrating the martial applications of Yang-style tai chi.

=== Creativity and challenges ===
Tung family tai chi includes training in traditional Yang style, and advanced students may also train in a Wu (Hao) form and Tung style forms as well. Tung Hu Ling contributed to this curriculum in many ways, including the Yang-style saber (刀, Pinyin: dāo, also translated as "falchion" or "broadsword") form, which he said he learned from "an uncle" because his father knew only the straight sword (劍, Pinyin: jiàn) and spear (槍, Pinyin: qiāng).

Tung Hu Ling further contributed advanced weapons forms he created himself, including vigorous routines for single and double saber with long leaps, high kicks, reverse spins, and challenging circles. For a time he taught those forms using sticks rather than swords, as sticks were easier to carry and practice with under the laws of British Hong Kong. He and his family further developed the stick forms after moving abroad.

He also developed a unique series of seven two-person push hands sets (simplified Chinese: 对练; traditional Chinese: 對練; pinyin: duìliàn) in Thailand, because many students there have a very martial orientation. In fact when Tung Hu Ling arrived to introduce tai chi in 1953, many were skeptical that the slow and gentle moves of tai chi could translate into a useful defense. During one of his first demonstrations in the country, two martial arts instructors suddenly decided to mount the stage and test him. The audience only saw that as the young men approached he turned left and right, and in the blink of an eye both were flying off the platform.

The following year, when his father toured the country, the 56-year-old Tung Ying-chieh defeated a challenger skilled in Muay Thai, Shaolin, Iron Palm, and other arts. This contributed to the fame of Tung family tai chi throughout Southeast Asia.

== North America ==
After his father's death in 1961, he at first continued leading classes at the Tung Ying Kit schools, with his sister Jasmine Mood-lay Tung (董茉莉, Jyutping: dung2 mut6 lei6, Pinyin: Dǒng Mòlì, 1940-2009) also teaching in Hong Kong, and his son Tung Kai Ying (董繼英, Jyutping: dung2 gai3 ying1; Pinyin: Dǒng Jìyīng, 1941-) taking over in Southeast Asia in 1962. But then in 1966 he was invited to promote tai chi on a trip to San Francisco, Los Angeles, New York, Toronto and Hawaii.

Lasting into 1967, the trip was sponsored by Wen-shan Huang and organized by Marshall Ho'o and others, and included a term teaching at the National Tai Chi Chuan Institute in Los Angeles assisted by Ho'o, who had regularly traveled to San Francisco's Chinatown to seek out tai chi masters and remarked that Tung's visit was "the first time a tai chi master came to us".

During that Los Angeles visit, Tung was interviewed by the editor of Black Belt Magazine, resulting in an extensive cover story that introduced his tai chi to a wider American audience. The writer marveled at Tung's ability to neutralize an attack by a larger man, who was "stopped suddenly in his tracks, bounced back into the air, and sent crashing into a wall", while Tung "seemed hardly to have exerted himself".

Over the next year, after trips to Europe, Thailand, and back to Hong Kong, Tung immigrated to the USA at the invitation of external-style martial arts masters and enthusiastic new disciples who implored him to become the first master of tai chi to reside in Hawaii. With their help he quickly established a new school and home base in Honolulu. His son Tung Kai Ying (董繼英, Jyutping: dung2 gai3 ying1; Pinyin: Dǒng Jìyīng, 1941-) joined him there in 1969 to help with the growing business, then in 1971 established his own school in Los Angeles.

In 1972 Tung Hu Ling produced a new edition of his father's 1948 book, 太極拳釋義 (The Meaning and Significance of T'ai Chi Ch'uan Practice; Pinyin: Tàijíquán Shìyì), adding detailed instructions and photos of himself performing the Ying-chieh Fast Form (英傑快拳, Pinyin: Yīngjié Kuàiquán). These were appended to the final chapter, which previously contained only that form's posture list and a short introduction.

Tung Hu Ling continued to travel and teach, including visits to China where he helped train his younger son Dong Zeng Chen (董增辰, Pinyin: Dǒng Zēngchén, 1947-) and grandson Alex Dong (董大德, Pinyin: Dǒng Dàdé, 1971-). They joined him in Hawaii in 1983 and took over the school there as he retired. Dong Zeng Chen himself retired in 2021.

Alex Dong established a school in New York in 2003, and Tung Kai Ying's son Chen-Wei David Tung (董振威, Pinyin: Dǒng Zhènwēi, 1977-) is a master instructor based in Los Angeles. The family continues to travel and teach in North and South America, Europe, and Asia.

== Legacy ==
Tung Hu Ling died in Honolulu on November 29, 1992. A T'ai Chi magazine cover story paid tribute early the following year with articles on the man, his art, and his life, in which his disciple Wu Ta-yeh noted, "Despite Master Tung's superb accomplishment, he was very modest and never talked about his own achievements. Because of this attitude of his, his students also did not publicize him or create an image for him. This is the reason why he has been little known in the United States as compared to other tai chi teachers. He never criticized other styles or other teachers. In fact, he never said, 'Wrong,' to his students, but just made the correction. This attitude perhaps reflects his mature training in Taijiquan."

== Bibliography ==
DeLeonardis, Anthony (July 1967). "The 'Grand Ultimate Fist' of Tai Chi Chuan". Black Belt Magazine. ISSN 0277-3066.

Dong, Zeng Chen (2016). Dong Style Tai Ji Quan. CreateSpace Independent Publishing Platform. ISBN 978-1535460774.

Kroll, Paul William (November 1976). "The World's Most Popular Martial Art Comes to America". Black Belt Magazine. Vol. 14, no. 11. ISSN 0277-3066.

Shirota, Jon (August 1972). "Tai Chi Chuan -- Art of Passive Resistance". Black Belt Magazine. ISSN 0277-3066.

Tung, Hu Ling (1956). 太極拳使用法 [Methods of Applying Taiji Boxing] (in Chinese).

Tung, Kai Ying (2012). Learning Tai Chi Chuan. Common Ground Publications. ISBN 978-0-9849582-0-7.

Tung, Ying-chieh (1948). 太極拳釋義 [The Meaning and Significance of T'ai Chi Ch'uan Practice]. Hong Kong editions published by C & C Joint Printing Co., (H.K.) Ltd., no ISBN, distributed worldwide by Alex Dong Tai Chi in Traditional Chinese and partial English translation editions; Taiwan edition published by Dah Jaan Publishing in Traditional Chinese, ISBN 978-986-346-242-2; mainland edition published by Beijing Science and Technology Publishing Co. Ltd. in Simplified Chinese (董英杰太极拳释义), ISBN 9787530486351.

Wu, Ta-yeh (February 1993). "The T'ai Chi Ch'uan Of Tung Huling". T'ai Chi. Vol. 17, no. 1. Wayfarer Publications. ISSN 0730-1049.

Wu, Ta-yeh; Ellis, Chip (February 1993). "Tung Huling Dies in Hawaii". T'ai Chi. Vol. 17, no. 1. Wayfarer Publications. ISSN 0730-1049.

Yu, Gongbao; 余, 功保 (2013). 董家太极: 董英杰太极拳传承与精义 [Dong Family Taiji: Dong Yingjie Taijiquan Tradition and Essentials] (in Chinese). Beijing: 当代中国出版社. ISBN 978-7-5154-0180-5. (Includes documentary on DVD, in Mandarin and some Cantonese, with no Chinese or foreign subtitles.)
