= Esther Rome =

American women's health activist and writer (1945–1995)

- Born: Esther Rachel Seldman; September 8, 1945; Norwich, Connecticut
- Died: June 24, 1995 (aged 49); Somerville, Massachusetts
- Education: Norwich Free Academy
- Alma mater: Brandeis University; Harvard Graduate School of Education
- Occupation: Women's health activist
- Years active: 1969–1995
- Spouse: Nathan Rome (m. 1967)
- Children: 2

Esther Rachel Rome (née Seldman; September 8, 1945 – June 24, 1995) was an American women's health activist and writer. She was part of group of 12 women who co-founded the Boston Women's Health Book Collective (now called Our Bodies, Ourselves), and wrote a widely published book called Women and Their Bodies that was updated and expanded over time. Rome successfully campaigned at grassroots levels at getting standardized absorbency ratings onto tampons, and was a consumer representative for the Food and Drug Administration in bringing about a partial moratorium on silicone-gel breast implants in 1992. Before her death, she was co-authoring a book on women's health issues in relation to her wish to accommodate their partners in a close relationship. Rome was one of 12 women memorialized by the Women's Community Cancer Project of the Women's Center of Cambridge in 1998.

== Early life ==
Rome was born on September 8, 1945, in Norwich, Connecticut. She was the youngest child of store owners Leo and Rose (née Deutsch) Seidman, and was the granddaughter of immigrant retailers. Rome had two brothers and one sister. She was raised in Plainfield, where the family business was located. In 1962, Rome graduated from Norwich Free Academy and enrolled at Brandeis University, where she graduated cum laude with a Bachelor of Arts degree in art in 1966. Afterward, she went to Harvard Graduate School of Education, and graduated with a Master of Arts degree in teaching two years later.

== Career ==
Rome had a liking for medicine since the second grade; she decided during her childhood she could not focus on becoming a doctor because very few women had entered this field in her era. In mid 1969, She began a career as a women's health advocate in changing the organization and delivery of healthcare for women. Rome focused on the body image of women, problems in cosmetic surgery, dietary needs and nutrition. She met a small gathering of women via a workshop entitled Women and Their Bodies held in a lounge at Emmanuel College in Boston to trade information concerning doctors and other health topics. The workshop transpired to be influential in 12 women, including Rome, establishing the Boston Women's Health Book Collective (later renamed to Our Bodies, Ourselves in 1971), and worked as a staffer at its office in Somerville, Massachusetts.

In 1970, the group published its first book containing publishing notes called Women and Their Bodies, and published by New England Free Press. The book, which initially discussed abortion and birth control, was updated and expanded, and later published in several languages on a mass scale by Simon & Schuster in 1973. From the 1970s onward, Rome understood that sexually transmitted infections (STI) had become an important concern for women, and recognized advice provided to those about the diseases were primarily directed from the perspective of males. She produced the first STI-prevention pamphlet specially for women, in order to counter a perceived bias in resources and literature. Rome then created STI-prevention stickers for distribution into women's public restrooms and other places where women were able to notice them.

She became involved in tampon safety in the 1980s through the American Society for Testing and Materials’ Tampon Task Force after it was determined that tampons had become associated with toxic shock syndrome. Her campaigning at the grassroots level prompted the passage of legislation to mandate standardized absorbency ratings of tampons, which included a warning and a pamphlet to inform individuals of the possible risks and safe usage of their products.

From 1988 until her death in 1994, Rome was involved in lobbying the Food and Drug Administration as a consumer representative to study a possibilities of hazards of silicone-gel breast implants and sought to regulate them. She contributed to form an acute and straightforward public awareness of the science on using silicone in the human body. Rome's efforts led the committee to impose a partial moratorium on silicone-gel breast implants in 1992. She also ran a Boston-based support group for women who suffered from health issues from having implants inserted into their breasts. Rome provided those in the television and printed press with information to inform the public about those problems, and put a fight of women who were pressured to change their physical appearance in a larger scene.

She publicly criticised of how premenstrual syndrome was defined, and argued this had converted a normal physical condition into a "disease". Rome and Jane Wegscheider Hyman were co-authoring Sacrificing Our Selves for Love at the time of her death. The book was published in 1996 and analyses health issues arising from domestic violence, starvation diets and cosmetic surgery in relation to a women's wish to accommodate their partners in a close relationship.

== Personal life ==
Rome married Nathan Rome on December 24, 1967 and had two sons with him. She was diagnosed with breast cancer in 1988; treatment to lessen the effects of the disease were unsuccessful and she continued to work throughout her illness. Rome died in Somerville, Massachusetts on June 24, 1995, and was buried at B'nai B'rith Cemetery in Peabody.

== Personality and legacy ==
She was a feminist, practiced Judaism, celebrated the Sabbath with her family on Friday nights, and was actively involved with the Temple B'nai B'rith in Somerville. Rome's obituarist in The Network News described her as "intelligent, compassionate, and fun person to work with".

Her efforts were influential in the passage of legislation and help to change how women perceive their bodies in their attitude and behavior. The Women's Community Cancer Project of the Women's Center of Cambridge memorialized her in a 12-woman mural at Cambridge, Massachusetts in 1998.
