= Meredith Tax =

American writer and activist (1942–2022)

- Meredith Tax, from a 1961 newspaper
- Born: September 18, 1942; Milwaukee, Wisconsin, U.S.
- Died: September 25, 2022 (aged 80); Teaneck, New Jersey, U.S.
- Education: Brandeis University; Birkbeck College
- Occupation: Writer
- Known for: Feminist writer; activist
- Spouses: Jonathan Schwartz (divorced) Marshall Berman (divorced)
- Children: 2

Meredith Jane Tax (September 18, 1942 – September 25, 2022) was an American feminist writer and political activist.

== Early life ==
Tax was born on September 18, 1942, in Milwaukee, Wisconsin, the daughter of Archie Tax, a physician, and Martha Brazy Tax. She graduated from Whitefish Bay High School in Whitefish Bay, Wisconsin, in 1960. In 1961, she represented Brandeis on College Bowl. She was a National Merit Scholar and was in the twelfth graduating class of Brandeis University in 1964. She spent the next four years at Birkbeck College, University of London, on Fulbright and Woodrow Wilson fellowships.

== Career ==
Despite her "dreams of a gilded career in the arts", Tax gave up the idea of an academic career in favor of movement work and became a writer and an activist. After returning to the US, she became a founding member of Bread and Roses, a socialist women's liberation organization in Boston, and joined the October League. Tax's 1970 essay, "Woman and Her Mind: The Story of Daily Life", is considered a classic document of the US women's liberation movement. She is the author of a history book, The Rising of the Women: Feminist Solidarity and Class Conflict, 1880–1917 (1980; 2001); two historical novels, Rivington Street (1982; 2001) and Union Square (1988; 2001), and a children's picture book, Families (1981; 1996, 1998), which was attacked by the Christian Coalition for its nontraditional approach to family structure. In 1995, she coauthored "The Power of the Word: Culture, Censorship and Voice", a pamphlet on gender-based censorship, with Marjorie Agosin, Ama Ata Aidoo, Ritu Menon, Ninotchka Rosca, and Mariella Sala.

Tax's collected papers are at Duke University's Sallie Bingham Center for Women's History and Culture. Her oral history was done in 2004 by the Voices of Feminism program at the Sophia Smith Collection. She wrote Double Bind: The Muslim Right, the Anglo-American Left, and Universal Human Rights, which criticizes left-wing support of right-wing Islamism. She also wrote many political and literary essays, for The Nation, The Village Voice, The Guardian, Dissent, openDemocracy, and other publications. Some of these essays, and her blog, can be found on her personal website.

Tax was a member of the Chicago Women's Liberation Union, and was the founding co-chair of the Committee for Abortion Rights and Against Sterilization Abuse (CARASA), a pioneering reproductive rights organization. In 1986, Tax and Grace Paley were founding co-chairs of the PEN American Center Women's Committee; she later became inaugural chair of International PEN's Women Writers' Committee and, in 1994, was founding president of Women's WORLD, a global free speech network of feminist writers. In 2011, she became chair of the board of the Centre for Secular Space, a think tank and advocacy group with a mission to oppose fundamentalism, amplify secular voices, and promote universality in human rights.

In 2022, Tax wrote about the need for a feminist movement on par with Occupy Wall Street and Black Lives Matter, which was disputed by the organizers of the Women's March.

== Personal life ==
Tax was Jewish and was married first to Jonathan Schwartz and later to Marshall Berman. She had two children, Corey Tax and Elijah Tax-Berman. She died on September 25, 2022, from breast cancer, in Teaneck, New Jersey.

== Books ==
- The Rising of the Women: Feminist Solidarity and Class Conflict, 1880–1917 (1980; 2001). ISBN 9780853455493.
- Rivington Street (1982; 2001). ISBN 9780252070327.
- Union Square (1988; 2001). ISBN 9780252070310.
- Families (1981; 1996, 1998). ISBN 9780316832403.
- A Road Unforeseen: Women Fight the Islamic State (2016). ISBN 9781942658108.
