= Huang Wenshan =

Chinese scholar and activist

- 黃文山
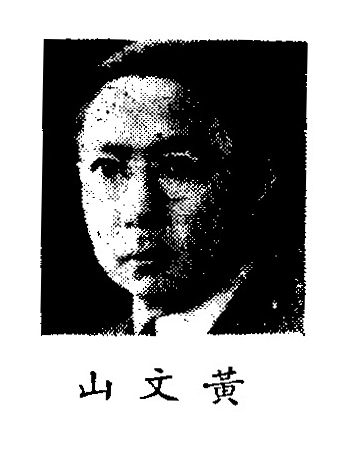
- Born: 1898; Shuibu, Taishan, Guangdong, Qing Empire
- Died: 1982, age 84
- Other names: Huang Lingshuang (黃凌霜); Wen-shan Huang
- Education: Peking University; Columbia University
- Occupations: Anthropologist, Sociologist
- Years active: 1919–1982

Huang Wenshan (Chinese: 黄文山; pinyin: Huáng Wénshān, also known as Wen-shan Huang, 1898–1988) was a Chinese scholar of cultural studies, sociology, anthropology and ethnology.

As a university student he was a well-known libertarian socialist during the May Fourth Movement. In his subsequent career he became a leading advocate for the science of culturology, lecturing and publishing on the topic in Chinese and English, at first under the pen name Huang Lingshuang (Chinese: 黃凌霜; pinyin: Huáng Língshuāng) and later under his given name, while researching and teaching in China and the United States.

He was also an avid practitioner and promoter of tai chi (taijiquan), and wrote one of the earliest comprehensive and popular books on the topic in English, explaining tai chi practice in the context of its cultural and philosophical foundations. He was the grandfather of Chinese-American visual artist and film director Andrew Thomas Huang.

== Early years ==
Born in Taishan, Guangdong in 1898, Huang studied in the philosophy department of Peking University, where Zhu Qianzhi was a classmate. During the May Fourth Movement in 1919, Huang was elected editor-in-chief of the Peking University Student Weekly by the Peking University Student Union. He and his successor in that post, fellow anarchist Zhu Qianzhi, organized a debate on anarchism there.

In March 1920, Huang was cultivated as a contact by the first official representative of the Communist International sent to China, Grigori Voitinsky, his wife Kuznetsova, their translator Yang Mingzhai and his entourage after their arrival in Beijing with the Soviet representative Stojanno, and later when they were active in Guangzhou.

In 1921, Huang graduated from Peking University. In 1922, he went to study in the United States where he earned a master's degree at Columbia University. During his studies in the United States from 1922 to 1928, he studied cultural theory under the anthropologist Alfred Kroeber.

== Academic career ==
In 1927, he served as a professor at National Labor University in Shanghai, and as a professor and director of the Department of Social History of Jinan University.

In 1930, Huang lived and translated books in Maojiazhuang, West Lake, and served as professor and director of the Department of Sociology at the National Central University in Nanjing. From the 1930s to the 1940s, he had contacts with scholars such as Yan Huanwen, Chen Gaozhu, Zhu Qianzhi, Cen Jiawu, and Chen Xujing.

In the summer of 1936, Huang resigned as professor and director of the Department of Sociology of National Central University and director of ethnic studies at the Zhongshan Culture and Education Center. He returned to Guangdong and became a professor at National Sun Yat-sen University in Guangzhou, where he founded programs for students of history, sociology, anthropology and other majors, and taught courses on culturology.

In 1940, Huang served as professor and director of the Department of Sociology at National Sun Yat-sen University. In May 1941, he became the Dean of the Law School of National Sun Yat-sen University. In 1945, he served as the Dean of Guangdong Legislative Business School.

In 1949, Huang left Mainland China for Taiwan. In 1950, at the invitation of Alfred Kroeber Huang went to Columbia University to serve as a guest scholar, and also taught at the New School in New York. He was given a grant from the Tsinghua Foundation (chaired by Mei Yiqi) to engage in cultural studies, and returned again to live in the United States. In 1960 he began teaching at the University of Southern California, in 1961 he served as dean of the Chinese Culture Institute in Los Angeles, and in 1962 he participated in the World Sociological Congress in Washington.

== Culturology ==
During the 1940s, Huang first began to correspond with American anthropologist Leslie White, who had coined the term culturology in 1939 to describe the systematic study of culture and cultural systems. Huang went on teach university courses and publish widely on the topic, and became a recognized advocate of this approach.

Russian-American sociologist Pitirim Sorokin in his 1966 book Sociological Theories of Today cited two of Huang's publications, Collected Essays on Culturology (Canton, 1939) and Theoretical Trends of Culturology (Taipei, 1959), as examples of how "Several scholars of various countries have advocated the establishment of a special science of culturology devoted to a study of cultural phenomena, differentiated from the science of sociology, which deals with social phenomena."

Huang's other publications on the topic included Culturology: Its Evolution and Prospects (Taipei, 1969), and An Introduction to Culturology (Hong Kong; Seattle, Wash, 1980) as well as a long list of Chinese-language books and journal articles in which the term culturology is translated as 文化学体系 (Pinyin: wénhuàxué tǐxì).

== Tai chi ==
An avid practitioner of tai chi (taijiquan) since his university days, in 1962 he founded the National Tai Chi Chuan Institute in Los Angeles, providing training space in the basement of a print shop he had established there. Marshall Ho'o assisted him in teaching the classes, which grew to hundreds of students in groups of thirty or more. Ho'o also helped him establish the National Tai Chi Chuan Association, linking schools throughout the United States.

Huang sponsored a teaching tour of North America by tai chi master Tung Hu Ling from 1966 to 1967, including a term at the Institute in Los Angeles. In the 1930s and 1940s Huang had trained under Tung's father, Dong Yingjie (Tung Ying-chieh). Ho'o, who regularly traveled to San Francisco's Chinatown to seek out tai chi masters there, said Tung's visit was "the first time a tai chi master came to us".

In 1967 Huang moved to Taiwan and turned leadership of the Institute and Association over to Ho'o. In 1973 Huang published the book Fundamentals of Tai Chi Chuan, which included an introduction to the Chinese cultural and philosophical context of tai chi as well as a detailed description of the art and its movements. One of the earliest comprehensive and popular books in English on the topic, it was subsequently released in three revised editions over the next dozen years, adding an introduction by Laura Huxley and forewords by Justin F. Stone, Prestin K. Caye, and James C. Ingebretsen.

== Personal life ==
He was the grandfather of Chinese-American visual artist and film director Andrew Thomas Huang, who has explained that Huang Wenshan brought family with him to New York in the 1950s, including the infant son who became his father. The family then moved with the patriarch to the Los Angeles area in 1960, where Andrew's father remained while his grandfather worked in Taiwan beginning in 1967.

== Later years ==
Huang continued to teach, lecture, research, and publish into the 1980s, regularly traveling from Taiwan to Los Angeles, where he died in 1982 at the age of 84 after a long illness.
