= Pooh Kaye =

Pooh Kaye (born 1961 in San Juan, Puerto Rico) is a Puerto Rican born American choreographer and filmmaker, noted for her use of the stop motion technique and choreography in film. She founded her dance company Eccentric Motion in 1983, whose past dancers included Sasha Waltz.

Kaye received her BA from Cooper Union and her MFA from Bennington College. Earlier in her career Kaye was associated with the post modern dance of Simone Forti and in 1976 danced in the guise of a bird in Forli's The Institute for Art and Urban Resources presents Group Works at PS1 in New York.

John Howell wrote in Artforum of one of her performances in 1987 at Manhattan's Joyce Theater..."Kaye’s performances and films have been perfect examples of faux naïf events for nearly a decade. (Her principal mentor was another performer of extremely personalized idiosyncrasy, Simone Forti)"... Her work was included in the 1985 Whitney Biennial. Kaye is both a Guggenheim and McDowell Colony fellow.
