= Bread and Roses (collective) =

Women's liberation collective in Boston, US

Bread and Roses was a socialist women's liberation collective active in Boston in the 1960s and 1970s. The group is named after the slogan of the 1912 Lawrence textile strike, with Bread signifying decent wages and Roses meaning shorter hours and more leisure time. The overarching theme of the original Bread and Roses movement pertained to gaining economic stability and dignity for women across the workforce.

== History ==
The collective was founded in the summer of 1969 by Meredith Tax and Linda Gordon. Tax stated, "We cannot talk of sisterhood without realizing that the objective position in society of most of us is different from that of welfare mothers, of the black maids of our white mothers, and of women in third-world countries. Sisterhood means not saying their fight is our fight, but making it our fight." In 1970, on International Women’s Day, the collective started their search for a physical space and by March 1971, they seized one of Harvard University's unoccupied buildings located at 888 Memorial Drive in Cambridge to offer classes, workshops, and childcare. This space lasted 10 days. This history was the subject of the 2017 Susan Rivo documentary "Left On Pearl".

After Susan Lyman donated $5,000, the collective was able to establish a new space at 46 Pleasant Street in Cambridge in June 1971. The Women’s Center formally opened there in January 1972 and was later incorporated as the Women’s Educational Center. This collective was composed of around 250 members, including Jean Tepperman, Frans Ansley, Judy Ullman and Trude Bennett, who believed that a revolution was necessary in order to gain women's liberation. These members formed a variety of sub-collectives which focused on specific topics, for example, women's health. The organization lasted until 1973.

The collective emerged in a Boston political context shaped by the New Left, anti-war activism, and racial segregation. At the time, Boston was a predominantly white and highly segregated city, and many members of Bread and Roses came from college-educated, middle-class backgrounds. A significant portion of the activist core had prior involvement in New Left organizations, and some identified as “red-diaper babies,” having grown up in left-wing political households. Members were often skeptical of established labor unions, which they viewed as exclusionary and insufficiently responsive to women’s and racial justice concerns.

The collective described itself as a “Revolutionary Autonomous Women’s Liberation Organization.” In this context, “revolutionary” signified support for anti-imperialist and Black liberation struggles as well as a rejection of incremental reform. Many members prioritized direct action, demonstrations, and consciousness-raising over engagement with legislatures or established institutions. This rejection of reformist strategies contributed to internal challenges and made it difficult to sustain broader coalitions over time.

In one instance, when organizers of an anti-war march requested a speaker from Bread and Roses, the collective sent three masked women rather than appointing a single representative, reflecting its resistance to individual leadership and public spokespersons.

Although the collective formally dissolved in the early 1970s, many former members continued organizing through successor organizations, including the Boston Area Socialist Feminist Organization. Participants later described Bread and Roses as shaping a durable political community that influenced Boston's socialist feminist movement for years afterward.

== Collective action ==
=== Women's health ===
A notable piece of work produced by the Bread and Roses collective was called Women and their Bodies: a Course, which was later developed into Our Bodies, Ourselves. This course was published in 1970 under the name of the Boston Women's Health Collective and combined the women's personal anecdotes with factual information regarding feminist issues and women's health. The topics included in this course were Women, Medicine, and Capitalism, an Introductory Course; Anatomy and Physiology; Sexuality; Some Myths About Women; Venereal Disease; Birth Control; Abortion; Pregnancy; Prepared Childbirth; Postpartum; and Medical Institutions. This course is often credited as the start to both the national and global women's health movement.

=== Labor ===
Related to the slogan from which the collective's name was derived, another notable contribution of the Bread and Roses collective was creating the clerical workers union 9 to 5, which is now known as local 925 of the Service Employees International Union. The creation of this union came about due to the high number of clerical workers in the collective who were underpaid and faced constant disrespect from their employers.

== Controversy ==
=== Intersectionality ===
Winifred Breines is a white feminist who has been active since the socialist feminist movement during the 1960s. She wrote multiple pieces that touch on the intersectionality, or lack thereof, within the Boston feminist scene including Struggling to Connect: White and Black Feminism in the Movement Years, What's love got to do with it? white women, black women, and feminism in the movement years, and Learning about Racism: White Socialist Feminism and Bread and Roses. During this movement, two prominent collectives were the Bread and Roses Collective, predominantly consisting of white, upper-class, educated women, and the Combahee River Collective, which was a black socialist group. Breines stated that many Black feminists felt that many white women were insensitive about issues that addressed their race and gender, going on to "suggest that privileged white feminists could focus only on issues of personal concern, unable to comprehend that for black feminists race and class were as important as sex discrimination."

There was common ground amongst Black and White feminists at the time that White men were the oppressors, however, past that there were many fundamental disagreements in their priorities of feminist movements. A major value of White feminists was the rejection of feminine socialization. This was the belief that young girls were socialized to fill the roles of mothers and wives, rather than succeed in their careers. For Black feminists, this held no power for them because their roles as wives and mothers did not exclude them from joining the workforce. Another point of contention was the idea of the nuclear family. White feminists viewed the concept of the nuclear family as a major oppressor as it worked to keep men in a position of power and women as housewives. This was a major focus of the Bread and Roses collective and the reason that the collective chose to offer childcare. For many Black women, the family was a sacred and admirable institution as they sought out to protect their own from the racism out in the world.

=== Internal struggles ===
What led to the quick disbandment of the Bread and Roses Collective (1969–1971), Jewish scholar Joyce Antler states, was that there was a lack of vision, structure, and established leadership that could move the collective's goals forward. While this was on account of the founders' socialist, anti-reformist beliefs, it later led to strife amongst members due to the prioritization of false sisterhood over creating a mass feminist movement.

Bread and Roses operated through small, largely autonomous collectives and mass meetings structured around participatory democracy. The organization rejected formal leadership positions, steering committees, and parliamentary procedure, viewing centralized authority as hierarchical and oppressive. Members sometimes described visible leadership as “star-tripping” or elitism. In retrospect, some participants argued that this strong anti-leadership stance contributed to informal power structures based on personal networks. Former members suggested that the absence of formal accountability mechanisms made it difficult to sustain the organization over time.

== Bibliography ==
- Antler, Joyce (2018). "'Conscious Radicals': The Jewish Story of Boston's Bread and Roses". Jewish Radical Feminism: Voices from the Women's Liberation Movement. Vol. 3. NYU Press. pp. 115–153. ISBN 978-0-8147-0763-0. JSTOR j.ctvwrm564.
- Breines, Wini (2002). "What's Love Got to Do with It? White Women, Black Women, and Feminism in the Movement Years". Signs. 27 (4): 1095–1133. doi:10.1086/339634. ISSN 0097-9740. JSTOR 10.1086/339634. S2CID 144139580.
- Lee, Choonib (2017). "Women's Liberation and Sixties Armed Resistance". Journal for the Study of Radicalism. 11 (1): 25–52. doi:10.14321/jstudradi.11.1.0025. ISSN 1930-1189. JSTOR 10.14321/jstudradi.11.1.0025. S2CID 151547883.
- Wells, Susan (2008). "Our Bodies, Ourselves: Reading the Written Body". Signs. 33 (3): 697–723. doi:10.1086/523710. ISSN 0097-9740. JSTOR 10.1086/523710. S2CID 143466088.
