= Winifred Breines =

American scholar

Winifred “Wini” Breines is an American sociologist, historian, and feminist scholar. She is professor emerita of Sociology and Women’s Studies at Northeastern University, where she taught from 1980 until her retirement in 2007. Her work has focused on race, gender, and social movements in the United States, with a focus on the New Left and second-wave feminism. She is the author of The Trouble Between Us: An Uneasy History of White and Black Women in the Feminist Movement and Young, white, and miserable: Growing up female in the fifties.

== Biography ==
She earned her B.A. from the University of Wisconsin in 1963, an M.R.P. from Cornell University in 1965, and a Ph.D. in Sociology from Brandeis University in 1979.

She began her academic career at Northeastern University, where she served as assistant professor, associate professor, and full professor before being named professor emerita of Sociology and Women’s Studies.

During her career she held fellowship at Bunting Institute, National Humanities Center, and a non-resident fellowship at the W. E. B. Du Bois Institute for Afro-American Research.

Since she retired, Breines has pursued a career in the arts focusing on watercolor paintings. She is a member of New England Watercolor Society.

== Scholarly work and research ==
Breines’s scholarship examines the development of social movements, gender identities, and political organization in the United States during the 1950s–1970s. Her works include studies of the New Left, postwar girlhood, the feminist movement, and documentary collections on 1960s social and political activism.

Breines’s The Great Refusal: Community and Organization in the New Left, 1962–1968 (1982) examines the development of the New Left through case studies of the Free Speech Movement and Students for a Democratic Society, emphasizing the influence of the Student Nonviolent Coordinating Committee and the principle of participatory democracy.

Her Young, White, and Miserable: Growing Up Female in the Fifties (1992) examines white middle-class girlhood in the 1950s, situating it within postwar domestic ideals and changing opportunities for women.

Breines co-edited, with Alexander Bloom, the documentary anthology Takin’ It to the Streets: A Sixties Reader (1995), which compiles primary documents related to major social and political movements of the 1960s, including civil rights, antiwar protest, feminism, student activism, gay rights, religion, and cultural politics.

Her book The Trouble Between Us: An Uneasy History of White and Black Women in the Feminist Movement (2006) examines relationships between white and Black women within feminist organizing, analyzing the intersections of race, class, and gender in shaping cooperation and division within the movement.

== Selected publications ==
=== Books ===
- Breines, Wini (2006). The Trouble Between Us: An Uneasy History of White and Black Women in the Feminist Movement. Oxford University Press. ISBN 978-0-19-533459-3.
- Bloom, Alexander; Breines, Wini (1995). "Takin' it to the Streets": A Sixties Reader. Oxford University Press. ISBN 978-0-19-506624-1.
- Breines, Wini (2001). Young, White, and Miserable: Growing Up Female in the Fifties. University of Chicago Press. ISBN 978-0-226-07261-6.
- Breines, Wini (1989). Community and Organization in the New Left, 1962-1968: The Great Refusal. Rutgers University Press. ISBN 978-0-8135-1403-1.

=== Articles ===
- Breines, Winifred (2007). "Struggling to Connect: White and Black Feminism in the Movement Years". Contexts. 6 (1): 18–24. doi:10.1525/ctx.2007.6.1.18. ISSN 1536-5042.
- Breines, Wini (2002). "What's Love Got to Do with It? White Women, Black Women, and Feminism in the Movement Years". Signs: Journal of Women in Culture and Society. 27 (4): 1095–1133. doi:10.1086/339634. ISSN 0097-9740.
- Breines, Wini (1996). "Sixties Stories' Silences: White Feminism, Black Feminism, Black Power". NWSA Journal. 8 (2): 101–121. doi:10.2979/nws.1996.8.2.101. ISSN 1040-0656.
