= Marshall Ho'o =

American martial artist (1910–1993)

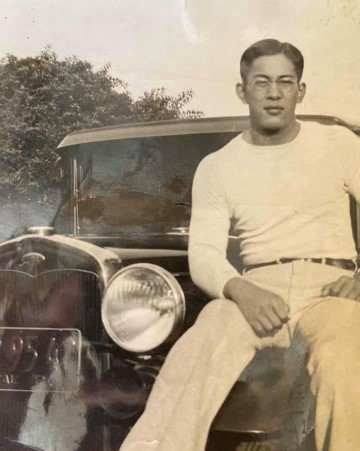
- Marshall Ho'o circa 1930s
- Born: May 6, 1910; Oakland, California, U.S
- Died: October 2, 1993 (aged 83)
- Known for: Practice in tai chi and Traditional Chinese medicine
- Spouse: Jill Goldstein Ho’o
- Children: 7

Dr. Marshall Ho'o (May 6, 1910 – October 2, 1993) was an American practitioner of tai chi and traditional Chinese medicine, known for his pioneering efforts to introduce and promote those healing arts, for which he received numerous awards in recognition of his community service. As part of that career he also had small roles in several major films, led tai chi instruction on his own television show, and authored a book on tai chi.

== Early life ==
Marshall Ho’o was born to Wing Locke “Charles” Hoo and Yit Lin “Rose” Ju in Oakland, California, on May 6, 1910. His parents’ wedding in March 1909 made headlines in the Oakland Tribune for their adoption of a Christian wedding instead of a traditional Chinese ceremony. Ho’o's father died in 1912 (aged 22) from a pulmonary hemorrhage. Ho’o and his infant sister, Elizabeth, were raised by their paternal aunt and her husband after their father's death.

== Early career ==
Ho’o said that he began his "fighting career" during the Great Depression, fighting in bread lines for his family's food, and that this motivated his lifelong concern with social justice. After moving to Los Angeles in his late twenties he became active in organized labor, for example helping to start the first company newspaper and first union at Hughes Aircraft while working as an engineer. He also helped organize waterfront protests against the export of scrap metal to Japan in 1939, to prevent its use in Japanese aggression against China.

He partnered in a successful business, the School Days Equipment Company, while continuing his community activism, and also earned a ministerial degree with The Church of England from the University of St Andrews. By 1949 he was considered a leading member of the Chinese-American community, and was frequently invited by various groups and organizations to give lectures addressing such topics as race relations in America and current events in mainland China.

=== Martial arts and health ===
In the 1930s he was introduced to tai chi in classes taught by Lo Sai Loan and Lo Yee Sing in a San Francisco Chinatown association cellar. After moving to Los Angeles, he returned to San Francisco regularly from 1944 through 1946 to train with Choy Hok Peng. Choy had learned Yang-style tai chi directly from Yang Chengfu and Chen Weiming. In the early 1950s Ho'o also began training in Kodokan judo and jujutsu in Los Angeles.

With business and activism his main focus, Ho'o's health had deteriorated by the age of 50 and he had developed bleeding ulcers. He sold his share of the school equipment company and moved to Guadalajara in Mexico to convalesce, where he practiced tai chi daily until his health problems began to clear up. Once he returned from Mexico, Ho’o devoted his life to the practice of martial arts and traditional Chinese medicine.

== Later career ==
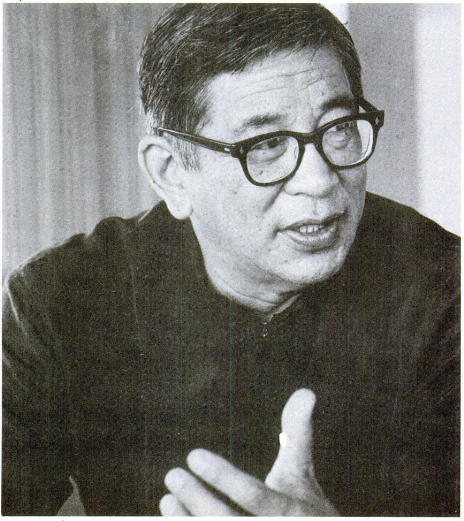
Marshall Ho'o circa 1970s

Ho’o and his mentor, Wen-shan Huang, whom Ho'o considered the father of tai chi in America, founded the National Tai Chi Chuan Association (NTCCA) in 1962. From 1966 to 1967 Huang sponsored a visit across North America by tai chi master Tung Hu Ling, son of his teacher Tung Ying-chieh. Ho'o took on the management and covered much of the cost for the Los Angeles portion of the tour, a long stay during which Tung taught a full term of tai chi classes.

Ho'o, who had regularly travelled to San Francisco for advanced tai chi training, said Tung Hu Ling's visit to Los Angeles was "the first time a tai chi master came to us.” Ho'o trained with Tung in the public classes and in private sessions, while also arranging side trips including a visit to Disneyland, where Tung calmed the crowd in a long unruly line by leaping over the boundary rope and performing the entire Yang-style tai chi form. One student reported she saw "tears welling in Marshall's eyes for the poetry of the moment and the joy of knowing his goals for the NTCCA were becoming a reality".

Huang moved to Taiwan in 1967 and left the NTCCA in the care of Ho'o. Under Huang's directive to spread tai chi "far and wide," Ho'o began teaching full-time and started expanding the organization beyond the Chinese community to all American ethnicities. From 1968 until his death in 1993, he led a free open air tai chi class every Saturday morning at Bronson Park in Los Angeles.

In 1973 Ho’o cofounded the Aspen Academy of the Martial Arts, a summer retreat in Aspen, Colorado that was "devoted to the teaching of Oriental martial arts and related disciplines in their true historical and philosophical context." Among the visiting instructors at the academy were Dan Inosanto, Koichi Tohei, Chungliang Al Huang, Baba Ram Das, Joo Bang Lee, Richard Bustillo, Remy Presas, Benjamin Lo, Martin Inn, Abraham Lui, John Kotsias, Robert Duggan and Howard Lee. Inosanto commented that the academy ran smoothly because of "the humanitarian element of Ho'o".

Ho'o held the post of Professor of Oriental History and taught tai chi at the California Institute of the Arts. He also taught courses at UCLA, Pomona College, California State University, Northridge and University of California, Irvine. In 1989 he moved to Yucaipa, California, and was Professor of Oriental Studies at the University of Redlands, and also taught at junior colleges in the area.

Ho'o was a licensed acupuncturist (OMD), and a member of the Black Belt Magazine Hall of Fame. He served as chairman of the East-West Acupuncture Society, and educational advisor to the Center of Chinese Medicine. He led a group of American doctors to China in 1978, and received numerous awards for his service to the community for his tai chi and other healing work, including awards from the National Acupuncture Association, Los Angeles Mayor Tom Bradley, California Secretary of State March Fong Yu, and State Senator Art Torres. In 1990 he studied healing techniques in China, and also visited tai chi masters as well as the Shaolin Monastery. On his last trip there in 1991, he did deeper research into Taoist philosophy.

== In Media ==
=== Film and television ===
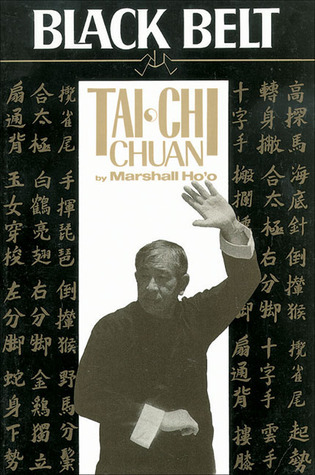
Original cover of Tai Chi Chuan by Marshall Ho'o

Ho'o portrayed Chinese doctors and martial arts instructors in the films Bob & Carol & Ted & Alice, The Osterman Weekend, Cannery Row, and Down and Out in Beverly Hills, as well as a Nike commercial.

He led tai chi instruction in his own weekly television series on KCET, channel 28, in Los Angeles. Premiering in October 1972, T'AI CHI CH'UAN from the Ch'ing Dynasty with Marshall Ho'o was so popular with viewers that by July 1973, KCET started broadcasting it four times a week. Other television stations from across the country also began airing the series.

=== Book and video ===
His book Tai Chi Chuan was published in 1986 by Ohara Publications, Inc., under the Black Belt Books imprint. Ho'o and Victoria Mallory appeared in the book's photos and in an accompanying videotape distributed by Ohara as part of the Black Belt Magazine Presents series. The original title of the book was Tai Chi Chuan: The 27 Forms, and it was listed under both titles as O'Hara publication number 449.

Attempting to reach a wider range of the American population, Ho’o focused the book and video on an "Eight-Minute Form", the simplified tai chi form "assembled by Chinese masters in the early days of modernization." Although normally taught as a 24-posture sequence, Ho'o wrote that it consists of about 30 different movements, and he taught it in 27 lessons with careful attention to detail. The book also included chapters on "Nine Temple Exercises" for health and as a warm-up before tai chi, "Basic Push Hands", and the "Health Benefits of the Form".

=== Magazines ===
He was featured in Black Belt magazine several times. In extensive interviews in 1976, he compared the societies of America and China based on his observations as one of the first Americans to attend the Canton Trade Fair, and in a cover story in the same issue he recounted his experiences with tai chi and his longstanding efforts to promote the art. He also explained that in addition to teaching simplified and traditional tai chi, he had developed his own personal "eclectic style" based on training in "six or so styles" and extracting what he considered "the best from each".

In a 1988 Black Belt article about one of his tai chi workshops, he was quoted explaining that he focused on the eight-minute form to ensure more students got the maximum benefit possible in the limited time the average American had available, but he introduced advanced concepts in forms, push hands, and applications for health and self-defense for those students with the interest and time to learn. In that workshop he distributed handouts showing how the short form is drawn from the full traditional Yang-style form as taught by Tung Ying-chieh, and he recommended doing the long form whenever time allowed. The workshop also included sessions on Chinese acupuncture, acupressure, herbology, and healthy cooking.

He was on the cover of the December 1993 T'ai Chi magazine, in a photo showing him performing the posture Turn and Kick with Left Sole. That issue featured a lengthy obituary based on information compiled by his student Doria Cook-Nelson on his life and his passionate commitment to introducing tai chi and acupuncture in America, as well as articles by students and the editor reflecting on their experiences with him, his unique teaching style, and his legacy.

== Death ==
Ho'o died on October 2, 1993. His family said he died unexpectedly, standing on his feet. The official cause was arteriosclerotic cardiovascular disease. He was survived by his wife, Jill Goldstein Ho’o, his younger sister, Elizabeth Bowen (née Hoo), his seven children: Brian, Galen, Maya, China, Tai, Tola and Lincoln, and his granddaughter Emma.
