= Paula Doress-Worters =

American writer, women's health activist (1938–2026)

Paula Doress-Worters (1938–2026) was an American women's health activist and author. She was a co-founder of the Boston Women's Health Book Collective and a co-author of the women’s health manual Our Bodies, Ourselves.

In 1987, she co-authored Ourselves, Growing Older: Women Aging with Knowledge and Power, which was updated in 1994 as The New Ourselves, Growing Older: Women Aging with Knowledge and Power.
