= Vox Femina Los Angeles =

Women's choral ensemble

Vox Femina Los Angeles (VFLA) is a women's choral ensemble dedicated to the performance of quality choral literature with an emphasis on music by female composers. It features an eclectic repertoire and has commissioned more than 20 new works for women's voices.

The ensemble was founded in January 1997 by Iris Levine and Stacey L. Poston, and first performed as guest artists with the Gay Men's Chorus of Los Angeles in April 1997. Vox Femina Los Angeles is funded by grants and private donations.

Vox Femina Los Angeles describes itself as "Diverse in... sexual identity" and has been closely associated with the gay community. In addition to its purely musical activities, Vox Femina Los Angeles aims to celebrate women and build bridges within and beyond the lesbian and gay communities through educational outreach.

VFLA's record Simply... Vox Femina Los Angeles won the 2003 OutMusic Award for best recording by a chorus or choir.

== Discography ==
- Still I Rise (live recording) (2006)
- Simply... Vox Femina Los Angeles (studio recording) (2002)
- Taking Shape (live recording) (1999)

== Notable appearances ==
- Vox Femina International Tour; Mexico City, Tepotzotlan, and San Miguel de Allende, Mexico; June – July, 2008
- Chorus America Annual Conference, June 2007
- American Choral Directors Association National Convention, Los Angeles, CA, February 2005
- GALA Choruses Quadrennial Festival, Montreal, Canada, July 2004
- American Choral Directors Association Western Division Convention, Las Vegas, NV, February 2004
- Sound Circle (women’s a cappella choral ensemble), Boulder, Colorado, November 2002
- GALA Choruses Quadrennial Festival, San Jose, CA, July 2000
- American Choral Directors Association Western Division Convention, Los Angeles, CA, February 2000
