= Lloyd Cross =

American physicist and holographer

Lloyd Cross is an American physicist and holographer.

As a physicist, Cross' research started in the 1950s, and focused primarily on masers and lasers at Willow Run Laboratories, at the University of Michigan. He first demonstrated maser action in a ruby crystal in 1957 and, as of 1960, Cross co-led a project group to design, build and operate a ruby maser preamplifier for a new radio telescope located at Peach Mountain, about 20 miles north of Ann Arbor. In 1968, he and Canadian sculptor Jerry Pethick, developed a simplistic stabilization system for holographic cameras, that for the first time did not require expensive optics and an isolation table, effectively making the medium accessible to artists. During the same year, Cross founded Editions Inc. in Ann Arbor which, in effect, became the world's first nonindustrial holographic studio focused on producing, exhibiting, and selling art holograms. In 1970, he organized the first exhibition of holographic art at Cranbrook Academy of Art in Bloomfield Hills, Michigan. This success, and laser research turning to military applications which he didn't want to be part of, prompted him to leave the laboratory and tour for a short time with a laser and sound show.

By 1971, Cross had made his way to San Francisco, California and founded the San Francisco Holography School, to teach his hologram techniques, setting up a studio in the basement of Project One. In 1972, he developed the "integral hologram" by combining holography with conventional cinematography to produce three-dimensional images that appeared to move. Sequential frames of two-dimensional movie footage of a rotating subject are recorded on holographic film. When viewed, the composite images are interpreted by the human eye as 3D image, in the same way that stereoscopy works. His most famous work in this form was a hologram of a woman that appeared to wink and blow a kiss as the viewer walked by, entitled The Kiss. This historic piece can be viewed at the Massachusetts Institute of Technology (MIT) Museum, Cambridge, Massachusetts

In the mid 1970s, Cross founded the Multiplex Corporation, to find commercial applications and further develop his holographic techniques.
