= Nancy Miriam Hawley =

American feminist activist

Nancy Miriam Hawley (born 1942) is an activist and feminist who contributed to the founding of Our Bodies, Ourselves. She also serves as a co-author of Ourselves and Our Children, and a publisher of You and Your Partner, Inc: Entrepreneurial Couples Succeeding in Business, Life and Love, in which she teamed up with her husband to publish. Hawley is also a clinical social worker, group therapist, principal clinical social worker for the Cambridge Hospital of Harvard Medical School, an organizational consultant and coach to business executives, and CEO of Enlightenment, Inc. She has worked with the Boston Women's Health Book Collective's board to help create ways to influence future health related issues.

== Education ==
Hawley was born in 1942. Encouraged by her mother, who never had a chance to obtain a professional degree, Hawley became a first-generation student who graduated from the University of Michigan in Ann Arbor where she received her bachelor's degree in History and Psychology. In addition, she received her master's degree in Social Work. Her specialty in groups and organizations led her to become a member of multiple groups and organizations, including the National Association of Social Workers, the Northeast Society of Group Psychotherapy, Women in Business Connection, and The Family Firm Institute.

== Early years ==
In 1966, after the birth of Hawley's first son, she paid a visit to her OB/GYN for her six-week check up. She was 23 years old. During this appointment, Hawley's doctor recommended she try a new pill on the market for birth control. When she asked what was in it, her doctor simply told her not to worry about it, and she refused to take the pill. At the time, most OB/GYNs were male, and most of the time husbands were told about their wives' conditions instead of the woman herself. In 2004, when reflecting on the 35th birthday of the first meeting, Hawley said, "We weren't encouraged to ask questions, but to depend on the so-called experts. Not having a say in our own health care frustrated and angered us. We didn't have the information we needed, so we decided to find it on our own." At a conference organized by the Women's, Gender, & Sexuality Studies Program at Boston University, Hawley claimed she had one burning question: "what's in this birth control pill?" It was a question her doctor would not answer, and this led her to find her own answers.

In 1968, women from Students for a Democratic Society, a student activist movement, and Hawley began to meet monthly in order to address what life was like as a woman on the Left side of politics. From these meetings, the idea developed of holding a women's liberation conference at Emmanuel College in Boston as a way to help women approach issues of concern. Hawley led the first workshop on women and their bodies at the conference, to address women's many concerns about their health. After the conference ended, the conversation continued with the formation of The Doctor's Group. Further discussion led to the writing of the influential book, Our Bodies, Ourselves.

== Our Bodies, Ourselves ==
Our Bodies, Ourselves is an international book written by 12 women, for women in 1969. The women at the workshop were talking about their experiences with doctors and trying to make a list of decent doctors. When they realized their list was too small, they decided it was time to take matters into their own hands. Women began researching information about their bodies from their personal experience and then sharing their findings with everyone else. This became the first edition of Our Bodies, Ourselves. According to Hawley, "every woman has a body, every woman is going to want this book."

Hawley's contribution to the book included the chapter on psychotherapy. In the 1960s, people believed the topic of psychotherapy for women should not be discussed, and many members of the Collective believed they should not be promoting it. However, against considerable opposition, Hawley's chapter on psychotherapy was included in the book. Hawley believed it was a good thing for women to know about and would benefit them in the end. When speaking about her chapter in Kathy Davis's book, The Making of Our Bodies, Ourselves, Hawley believed the original chapter was full of anger and did not get the point across as well as it could have. She went as far as to say it may have even scared people off. However, she still believed it would be beneficial. According to Hawley, "every woman has a body, every woman is going to want this book."
