= Our Bodies, Ourselves =

1970s book about women's health and sexuality

- first edition cover
- Author: Boston Women's Health Book Collective
- Language: English
- Published: 1973
- Publisher: Simon & Schuster
- Publication place: United States
- Pages: 276
- ISBN: 0671214349

Our Bodies, Ourselves is a book about women's health and sexuality. Written by members of the Boston Women's Health Book Collective, it was initially self-published in 1970 as a booklet called Women and Their Bodies: A Course. The first commercially published print edition came out in 1973 under the title Our Bodies, Ourselves: A Book by and for Women. The book, often referred to by the initials OBOS, was subsequently revised and expanded six times until the final print edition appeared in 2011.

The early editions were groundbreaking in the way they encouraged women to understand and celebrate their sexuality, with sections on reproductive rights, lesbianism, sexual independence, and masturbation. The book offered graphic illustrations and frank talk on topics such as birth control, pregnancy, childbirth, venereal disease, postpartum depression, menopause, and abortion. The emphasis in OBOS on women's engagement with their own sexual desires stood in contrast to traditional notions of women as "passive and docile" and men as "active and aggressive" in sexual relationships. The expanded later editions also covered topics such as reproductive justice, violence against women, gender identity, and environmental health.

OBOS has been translated and adapted by women's groups around the world and is available in 34 languages. Combined sales for all editions exceed four million copies. The New York Times called it "America's best-selling book on all aspects of women's health" and a "feminist classic".

== History ==
The women's health workshop that inspired OBOS was organized in spring of 1969 by Nancy Miriam Hawley. The workshop, titled "Women and Their Bodies", was part of a female liberation conference held at Boston's Emmanuel College. In a 2004 interview, Hawley recalled the state of women's health care at the time: "We weren't encouraged to ask questions, but to depend on the so-called experts. Not having a say in our own health care frustrated and angered us. We didn't have the information we needed, so we decided to find it on our own."

The workshop attendees were a small group of college-educated women ranging in age from 23 to 39. They shared stories about the health issues they faced, and their frustrating interactions with doctors. In the months that followed, they met regularly and soon realized how little knowledge they had about their own anatomy. They resolved to obtain the knowledge themselves. The women, individually and in pairs, each took a topic to research and write about, for example, Wendy Sanford wrote about abortion, Jane Pincus and Ruth Bell about pregnancy, and Paula Doress and Esther Rome about postpartum depression. They read textbooks and medical journals; consulted with trusted medical authorities; and gradually assembled information in the form of course material.

The group mimeographed what they wrote and used it as the basis for informal classes in women's health taught in the Boston area. The authors decided to consolidate their writeups into "an accessible format that could be shared and would serve as a model for women to learn about themselves, communicate their findings with doctors, and challenge the medical establishment to change and improve the care that women receive."

The result was a 75-cent, 193-page stapled booklet called Women and Their Bodies: A Course. Published in 1970, in partnership with the New England Free Press (a New Left publishing firm), it became an "underground sensation", selling 250,000 copies in New England without any formal advertising. To meet growing demand, Women and Their Bodies was reprinted in 1971 under the name, Our Bodies, Our Selves: A Course by and for Women.

As a result of the booklet's success, in 1972, the authors—now a core group of twelve women—formed the non-profit Boston Women's Health Book Collective (BWHBC) (rebranded the "Our Bodies Ourselves" collective in 2002) and prepared a mass-market print edition. The book was expanded to 276 pages; retitled Our Bodies, Ourselves: A Book by and for Women; and published by Simon & Schuster in March 1973. As a precondition of working with the publishing company, BWHBC members stipulated they must retain complete control of the book's contents, they must have a woman editor, and non-profit clinics must be able to purchase copies at a substantial discount.

OBOS featured first-person stories from women, and tackled many topics then regarded as taboo. The book's publication is considered a foundational event in the women's health movement in the U.S.

In the 1973 Preface, the authors cited four lessons learned during their research: (1) that it was important to supplement medical facts with personal experiences, how the latter could enrich knowledge of women's bodies; (2) that possessing basic information was liberating; it meant women were "better prepared to evaluate the institutions that are supposed to meet our health needs"; (3) that they were combating an ignorance which plagued women for centuries and "had one major consequence—pregnancy. Until very recently pregnancies were all but inevitable, biology was our destiny"; (4) that "body education is core education. Our bodies are the physical bases from which we move out into the world; ignorance, uncertainty—even, at worst, shame—about our physical selves create in us an alienation from ourselves that keeps us from being the whole people that we could be."

The BWHBC was approached by women in other countries who wanted to translate OBOS. Dagmar Schultz brought a copy to Germany in the early 1970s, where it was translated and quickly had an impact; the first women's health center was founded in West Berlin in 1973 and still exists today. BWHBC members initiated the Spanish translation themselves, self-publishing Nuestros Cuerpos, Nuestras Vidas in 1977. But they soon recognized the limitations of verbatim translation, how "aspects of the book that were culturally appropriate for the original US readers did not always make sense in other contexts." In the 1980s, a BWHBC-affiliated group named Amigas Latinas en Accion pro-Salud began working on a new Spanish-language cultural adaptation of OBOS that would better reflect their experiences. It was published in 2000.

The cover of the 2005 edition, described as a "new edition for a new era".

After 1973, revised and expanded OBOS editions were published in 1976, 1986, 1992, 1996, 2005 and 2011. All told, it is estimated that over four million copies of the book have been sold. The final print edition in 2011 covers many topics not found in the 1973 edition, and grew in length to 825 pages.

In 2018, the Our Bodies Ourselves collective announced that due to resource constraints, it could no longer publish new print editions nor update its website with new health information.

In 2022, the collective started a collaboration with the Center for Women's Health and Human Rights at Suffolk University and launched "Our Bodies, Ourselves Today", a website bringing health and sexuality information to women, girls, and gender-expansive people. Members of the BWHBC have donated many of their papers to be available for researchers, including through the Boston Women's Health Book Collective archive at the Arthur and Elizabeth Schlesinger Library at Harvard University.

Over the years, several BWHBC members also published single-topic books:

- Ourselves and Our Children (1978)
- Ourselves, Growing Older: Women Aging with Knowledge and Power (1987)
- Changing Bodies, Changing Lives: A Book For Teens on Sex and Relationships (1980, 1988, 1998)
- Our Bodies, Ourselves: Menopause (2006)
- Our Bodies, Ourselves: Pregnancy and Birth (2008)

The founders of the BWHBC wrote the afterword to Trans Bodies, Trans Selves, a 2014 book by and for trans people that was modeled on Our Bodies, Ourselves.

== Politics ==
Written during a moment of political activism in Boston's history, Women and Their Bodies came out of the Bread and Roses collective, a radical women's liberation group formed in 1969. Although Bread and Roses was short-lived, some of the projects it spawned, such as OBOS, had a lasting impact.

The radical roots of the BWHBC, and the influence of second-wave feminism, are evident in the overt political messaging found in the first editions. The opening essay was called "Women, Medicine and Capitalism", and drew a connection between the economic system and the quality of women's health. In a section on how to navigate the American health care system, there were subsections titled "The Capitalist Theory of Disease Causation", "The Power and Role of Male Doctors", and "The Profit Motive in Health Care". Historian Linda Gordon alleges that OBOS "would have been inconceivable without the civil rights/new left/feminist context. It included a left-wing critique of medicine in a corporate economy".

Laura Barton adds that it was not just the subjects broached which made OBOS a radical text; it was also "the fact that it was written by women for women. In so doing, it challenged the power and role of the largely male medical profession." The experiences of women were quoted throughout, while the social and political context of women's health informed the content of the book. The authors emphasized empowerment through learning and information, specifically, information gained through women sharing their personal narratives with each other because "by sharing our responses we can develop a base on which to be critical of what the experts tell us."

The later OBOS editions joined in the battle for reproductive justice, argued for women's bodily autonomy and the right to have children or not have children. But as the book evolved, the political stridency was toned down, a change that Elizabeth Gumport viewed with regret in a 2018 New York Times essay: "[S]omething of the soul of those early editions had been lost. In this most recent, and ultimately final, edition, the politics of women's health was not elided, but it had been consolidated into its own section, toward the back of the book."

== Style and tone ==
From the beginning, OBOS was written in an inclusive, non-judgmental style. It addressed readers as companions ("While we work to change..."), and used plain language to demystify medical knowledge. The tone throughout "was informal and warm – the voice of a trusted but authoritative friend. It quickly earned a reputation as a book to be passed from mother to daughter."

The BWHBC writers sometimes referred to their authorial voice as "OBOS style". When they attempted to define it as an aid for book translators, the style was summarized in five principles:

1. no rhetoric
2. use we
3. give choices
4. non-directive—never say this is the way
5. respect that the person reading it can make the choice herself.

== In the media ==
In the 1988 pilot episode of The Wonder Years, Kevin Arnold swipes a copy of Our Bodies, Ourselves from his older sister Karen. He and his friend Paul Pfeiffer then flip through the book to "prepare" themselves for junior high school.

The 2014 documentary film She's Beautiful When She's Angry covers the women's liberation movement from 1966 to 1971. The film features members of the original Boston Women's Health Book Collective who discuss Our Bodies, Ourselves.

In November 2020, the BBC World Service aired a podcast, as part of its "Witness History" series, on the writing of Our Bodies, Ourselves.

== See also ==
- The Honest Body Project
- Trans Bodies, Trans Selves
