= Bradshaw (surname) =

- Pronunciation: /ˈbrædʃɔː/

Origin
- Origin: Old English
- Meaning: derived from the Old English brad 'broad' and sceaga 'thicket'
- Region of origin: England, especially Lancashire and West Yorkshire

Other names
- Variant forms: Brayshaw, Bradshawe

Bradshaw is a surname.

The surname Bradshaw was first found in Lancashire at Bradshaw, now part of Greater Manchester. The chapelry of Bradshaw was listed as Bradeshaghe in 1246, meaning '{{{1}}}'broad wood or copse}} (Old English brad + sceaga).

== People with the surname include ==
=== A ===
- Aaron Bradshaw (born 2003), American basketball player
- Adrian Bradshaw, British military leader
- Adrian Bradshaw (photographer), British photographer
- Ahmad Bradshaw, American football player
- Albert James Bradshaw, Canadian politician
- Alexander Bradshaw, British physicist
- Alexandra Bradshaw, Canadian-American artist
- Allison Bradshaw (born 1980), American tennis player
- Ann Bradshaw (disambiguation), multiple people
- Augustine Bradshaw, Benedictine monk

=== B ===
- Ben Bradshaw, British politician
- Benjamin Bradshaw, American wrestler
- Bill Bradshaw (rugby league), English rugby league footballer
- Booker Bradshaw (1941–2003), record producer, film & TV actor, Motown executive
- Brent Bradshaw, comedy writer
- Brett Bradshaw, American drummer

=== C ===
- Carl Bradshaw (actor), Jamaican actor
- Carl Bradshaw (footballer), footballer
- Cathryn Bradshaw, British actress
- Charlie Bradshaw (disambiguation), multiple people
- Chris Bradshaw, Canadian politician
- Claudette Bradshaw (1949–2022), Canadian politician
- Clyde Bradshaw, American basketball player
- Constance Bradshaw, British artist
- Craig Bradshaw (basketball), New Zealand basketball player
- Craig Bradshaw (American football), American football player

=== D ===
- Dallas Bradshaw, American baseball player
- Daniel Bradshaw (born 1978), Australian rules footballer
- Darren Bradshaw (disambiguation), multiple people
- David Bradshaw, American artist
- Donald Bradshaw, American businessman and mayor
- Douglas Bradshaw, Canadian military leader
- Dove Bradshaw, American artist
- Duncan Bradshaw (born 1986), Zimbabwean-born English cricketer

=== E ===
- Elias Bradshaw, American politician
- Ernest Bradshaw, English footballer
- Evans Bradshaw, American jazz pianist

=== F ===
- Ford Bradshaw, American bank robber
- Frank Bradshaw, English footballer
- Franklin Bradshaw, American curler
- Fred Bradshaw, Canadian politician
- Fergal Bradshaw, Gaelic footballer

=== G ===
- Gareth Bradshaw, Gaelic footballer
- Gary Bradshaw, English footballer
- Gay A. Bradshaw, American psychologist and ecologist
- George Bradshaw (1801–1853), English printer and publisher
- George Bradshaw (baseball), American baseball player
- George Bradshaw (footballer), English footballer
- Gillian Bradshaw, American author
- Granville Bradshaw (1887–1969), English aero-engine designer

=== H ===
- H. Chalton Bradshaw, British architect
- Harold E. Bradshaw, American politician
- Henry Bradshaw (disambiguation), multiple people

=== I ===
- Ian Bradshaw, West Indian cricketer from Barbados
- Ian Bradshaw (photographer), American photographer

=== J ===
- Jack Bradshaw, English footballer
- James Bradshaw (disambiguation), multiple people
- Joanne Bradshaw, Australian Paralympic athlete
- Joseph Bradshaw (disambiguation), multiple people
- John Bradshaw (disambiguation), multiple people
- John Layfield, ring name "Bradshaw" (born 1966), professional wrestler

=== K ===
- Keith Bradshaw (disambiguation), multiple people
- Ken Bradshaw, professional surfer
- Kenrick Bradshaw, Aruban footballer
- Kevin Bradshaw, American basketball player

=== L ===
- Leslie Bradshaw, American businesswoman
- Lucretia Bradshaw (fl. 1714 - 1741), English actress
- Lucy Bradshaw, British actress and singer
- Lucy Bradshaw (game developer), American video game developer
- Luisa Bradshaw-White, English actress

=== M ===
- Máire Bradshaw (born 1943), poet and publisher
- Margaret Bradshaw, New Zealand geologist
- Mark Bradshaw (disambiguation), multiple people
- Marquita Bradshaw (born 1974), American environmentalist and former political candidate
- Melissa Bradshaw, English musician
- Merrill Bradshaw, an American composer and professor
- Michael Bradshaw (1933–2001), English stage and film actor
- Michael J. Bradshaw, British geographer
- Morris Bradshaw (1952–2025), American football player

=== N ===
- Nigel Bradshaw, British-born actor

=== P ===
- Paddy Bradshaw, Irish footballer
- Paul Bradshaw (disambiguation), multiple people
- Paula Bradshaw, Northern Irish politician
- Peter Bradshaw, British writer
- Philippe Bradshaw, British artist
- Preston J. Bradshaw, American architect

=== R ===
- Reggie Bradshaw, Canadian football player
- Richard Bradshaw (disambiguation), multiple people
- Rita Bradshaw, British romance novelist
- Robert Bradshaw (disambiguation), multiple people
- Roy Bradshaw (disambiguation), multiple people

=== S ===
- Sally Bradshaw, English singer
- Samuel Carey Bradshaw (1809–1872), U.S. congressman from Pennsylvania
- Santia Bradshaw, Barbadian politician and deputy prime minister of Barbados
- Scott B. Sympathy, real name Scott Bradshaw, Canadian indie rock musician
- Sidney Bradshaw Fay, historian
- Sonny Bradshaw, Jamaican musician
- Steve Bradshaw, American soccer player
- Sufe Bradshaw, an American actress
- Susan Bradshaw, British pianist

=== T ===
- Terry Bradshaw (born 1948), American football player and television personality
- Terry Bradshaw (baseball), American baseball player
- Thomas Bradshaw (disambiguation), multiple people
- Tiny Bradshaw (1905–1958), U.S. jazz musician

=== W ===
- Walter Bradshaw, English cricketer
- Wes Bradshaw, American football player and coach
- William Bradshaw (disambiguation), multiple people
- Wilson G. Bradshaw, president of Florida Gulf Coast University

== Fictional characters ==
- The Bradshaws, a fictional family on Piccadilly Radio
- Lt. Bradley "Rooster" Bradshaw, in Top Gun: Maverick
- Carrie Bradshaw, a fictional newspaper columnist and protagonist of Sex and the City
- Cooper Bradshaw, a character in Guiding Light
- LTJG Nick "Goose" Bradshaw, in Top Gun
