= Bradshaw =

Bradshaw may refer to:

== Places ==
Canada

- Bradshaw, Lambton County, Ontario

United Kingdom

- Bradshaw, Calderdale, West Yorkshire
- Bradshaw, Kirklees, West Yorkshire, a location
- Bradshaw, Greater Manchester
- Bradshaw, Staffordshire, a location
- Bradshaw Brook, a river in Northern England

United States

- Bradshaw Mountains, a mountain range in Arizona
  - Bradshaw Mountain Railroad, a railroad in Arizona
  - Bradshaw Mountain High School, school in Arizona
- Bradshaw Trail, an overland stage route in Southern California
- Bradshaw, Maryland
- Bradshaw, Nebraska
- Bradshaw, Virginia
- Bradshaw, Logan County, West Virginia
- Bradshaw, McDowell County, West Virginia

Elsewhere

- Bradshaw Field Training Area, Australian army training ground
- Bradshaw Station, a pastoral lease in the Northern Territory of Australia
- Bradshaw Sound, a fiord in New Zealand
- Mount Bradshaw, a mountain peak in Antarctica
- Port Bradshaw Peninsula, alternative name for Yalangbara Peninsula, Yalangbara, Northern Territory, Australia
- Robert L. Bradshaw International Airport, in Saint Kitts

== People ==
- Bradshaw (surname), people with the surname Bradshaw
- Barbara Bradshaw Smith, (1922-2010) Relief Society president for The Church of Jesus Christ of Latter-day Saints
- Bradshaw Crandell, (1896-1966) American artist
- Bradshaw Dive, (1865-1946) New Zealand politician
- George Bradshaw Kelly, (1900-1971) American politician
- James Bradshaw Adamson, (1921-2003) American military leader
- John Bradshaw Gass, (1855-1939) English architect and artist
- Bradshaw (wrestler), (born 1966) the ring name of professional wrestler John Layfield
- The Bradshaws, a fictional family on Piccadilly Radio

== Organisations ==
- Bradshaw Gass & Hope, an English architecture firm
- Bradshaw International, an American cookware company
- Hamilton Bradshaw, a British private equity firm
- Henry Bradshaw Society, a British publishing company

== Other uses ==
- 8223 Bradshaw, an asteroid discovered in 1996
- Gwion Gwion rock paintings (former colonial name "Bradshaws"), Australian rock art
- Bradshaw Lecture, a lecture series delivered at the Royal College of Physicians and Royal College of Surgeons
- Franklin Bradshaw murder, a 1978 murder in Utah
- Bradshaw model, which describes river mechanics
- Bradshaw's, railway timetables and travel guides named after the English publisher George Bradshaw

== See also ==
- Brad Shaw (born 1964), Canadian ice hockey player and coach
