= Tom Bradshaw =

Tom Bradshaw may refer to:

- Tom Bradshaw (farmer) (born 1982), farmer and president of the NFU
- Tom Bradshaw (footballer, born 1879) (1879–1930), English association footballer of the 1890s and 1900s for Blackpool, Sunderland and Nottingham Forest
- Tom Bradshaw (footballer, born 1904) (1904–1986), Scottish association footballer of the 1920s and 1930s for Scotland, Bury, Liverpool and Third Lanark
- Tom Bradshaw (footballer, born 1992), Wales international footballer
- Tom Bradshaw (musician) (born 1935), American steel guitar player

== See also ==
- Thomas Bradshaw (disambiguation)
