= Adrian Bradshaw =

Adrian Bradshaw may refer to:

- Adrian Bradshaw (British Army officer) (born 1958), British Army officer
- Adrian Bradshaw (photographer) (born 1964), British photojournalist
