= Twickenham Streaker =

Twickenham Streaker can apply to people who have streaked at Twickenham Stadium:

- Michael O'Brien in 1974, famously photographed by Ian Bradshaw
- Erica Roe in 1982
