= John Bradshaw =

John Bradshaw may refer to:

== Politicians ==
- John Bradshaw (died 1588), MP for Radnorshire
- John Bradshaw (died 1567), MP for Ludlow
- John Ernest Bradshaw (1866–1917), politician in Saskatchewan, Canada
- John Bradshaw (Australian politician) (born 1942), former member of the Western Australian Legislative Assembly

== Others ==
- John Bradshaw (judge) (1602–1659), English judge
- John Bradshaw (writer) (born 1658/9), English criminal and supposed political writer
- John Bradshaw (author) (1933–2016), American educator and self-help writer
- John W. S. Bradshaw, anthrozoologist, author of Cat Sense and Dog Sense
- John Bradshaw (Adventist) presenter of It Is Written
- John Layfield (born 1966), better known by the ring name John "Bradshaw" Layfield, American professional wrestler
- John Bradshaw (cricketer) (1812–1880), English cricket player born in Leicestershire
- John Christopher Bradshaw (1876–1950), New Zealand organist, conductor, choirmaster and university professor
- John Bradshaw (botanist) (1863–1939)

== See also ==
- Augustine Bradshaw (1575–1618), British Catholic, born John Bradshaw
- John Bradshaw Gass (1855–1939), British architect and artist
