= William Bradshaw =

William, Bill or Billy Bradshaw may refer to:

- William Bradshaw (Puritan) (1571–1618), English Puritan
- William Bradshaw (MP), Welsh politician who sat in the House of Commons from 1604 to 1611
- William Bradshaw (writer) (fl. 1700), British hack writer
- William Bradshaw (bishop) (1671–1732), bishop of Bristol
- William Bradshaw (cabinetmaker), 18th century British cabinet-maker
- William Bradshaw (VC) (1830–1861), Irish recipient of the Victoria Cross
- William D. Bradshaw (1826–1864), United States western pioneer
- William R. Bradshaw (1851–1927), American writer
- William Bradshaw (footballer) (1882–?), English footballer with Arsenal, Fulham, Burton United & Burnley
- William Bradshaw, Baron Bradshaw (born 1936), British academic and politician
- William Bradshaw (British Army officer) (1897–1966)
- Billy Bradshaw (footballer) (1884–1955), England international footballer, who played for Blackburn Rovers
- Bill Bradshaw (rugby league) (died 2017), rugby league footballer of the 1940s
- Billy Bradshaw, a fictional character, in The Bradshaws family
