= Henry Bradshaw =

Henry Bradshaw or Harry Bradshaw may refer to:

- Henry Bradshaw (poet) (c. 1450–1513), English poet
- Henry Bradshaw (scholar) (1831–1886), British scholar and librarian
- Harry Bradshaw (football manager) (c. 1854–1924), English football manager
- Harry Bradshaw (footballer, born 1873) (1873–1899), England international footballer
- Harry Bradshaw (footballer, born 1895) (1895–after 1923), football goalkeeper
- Harry Bradshaw (footballer, born 1896) (1896–1967), English footballer
- Harry Bradshaw (golfer) (1913–1990), Irish professional golfer
- Harry Bradshaw (rugby league), rugby league footballer who played in the 1950s for England, Dewsbury, and Huddersfield
- Harry Bradshaw (rugby) (1868–1910), rugby union and rugby league footballer who played in the 1890s
- Henry Bradshaw (jurist), Chief Baron of the Exchequer of England in 1552
