= Melissa Bradshaw =

British journalist

- Born: Norwich, Norfolk, England
- Education: St Edmund Hall, Oxford
- Occupations: Writer, journalist, magazine editor

Melissa Bradshaw is a writer and journalist based in London. Bradshaw is known primarily for her work in music.

She is the daughter of Steve Bradshaw and Jenny Richards.

== Education ==
Bradshaw won an academic scholarship to Bryanston School and later attended North London Collegiate School.

During her studies in English at St Edmund Hall, Oxford, Bradshaw was a contributor to the university's long-standing newspaper, Cherwell. Later, she went on to become editor of the Isis Magazine.

She gained an MA on Gender, Culture and Politics and a PhD from Birkbeck College, London, and held an Arts and Humanities Research Council doctoral award. Her PhD thesis, on Sylvia Plath, Elizabeth Bishop, and Psychoanalysis, was examined by Jacqueline Rose and Linda Anderson.

== Current ==
Bradshaw contributed notable articles and reviews for Plan B magazine. She has interviewed many of London's key influential musicians in Dubstep, such as Skream, Digital Mystikz, Loefah and Kode 9, and other musicians including Frank Ocean, Grace Jones, Roots Manuva, and The Gossip. She has also contributed to Woofah and WAH magazines.

Between 2008 and 2009, she was music editor of German magazine Qvest and Qvest Edition.

In 2010, she interviewed Sade for Pop, where she is currently a Contributing Editor.

She wrote a short history of soundsystems in the UK for Red Bull Music Academy London 2010.

She has also written on controversies about Rihanna's Pour It Up and Miley Cyrus.
