= The Isis Magazine =

Student publication of the University of Oxford

The Isis
- Cover of the Hilary 2020 issue of The Isis
- Type: Termly magazine at the University of Oxford
- Owner: Oxford Student Publications Limited
- Editor: Finn Currie and Gruffydd Price
- Founded: 1892
- Language: English
- Headquarters: Folly Bridge, Oxford
- Circulation: c. 4,500
- Website: isismagazine.org.uk

The Isis is a student publication at the University of Oxford, where the magazine was established in 1892. Historically a rival to the student newspaper Cherwell, Isis was finally acquired by the latter's publishing house, Oxford Student Publications Limited, in the late 1990s. It now operates as a termly magazine and website, providing an outlet for features journalism, although for most of its life it appeared weekly. The two publications are named after the two rivers in Oxford, "Isis" being the local name for the River Thames.

== History ==
The Isis was founded by Mostyn Turtle Piggott, the first of the student editors, on 27 April 1892. In his first editorial he wrote:

"We have no politics and fewer principles, and should we last until the General Election we shall use our influence for neither side. We shall endeavour to be humorous without being ill-humoured, critical without being captious, militant without being malevolent, independent without being impertinent, and funny (as Mr Albert Chevalier says) without being vulgar."

In its early days, the Isis was owned and published by the Holywell Press. Students were given complete independence, as long as the paper they produced was profitable and within good taste. Oxford welcomed the addition to its scene wholeheartedly, and was more than prepared to pay the weekly sixpence. The Isis was an accurate recorder of proceedings in the Oxford Union - enough of a function to maintain sales. The same price (2.5p in modern money) lasted into the 1960s.

One of the features of the magazine that survives today is the "Icons" section (then known as "Idols"). In the 1890s, being President of OUDS (the Oxford University Dramatic Society) seemed to guarantee an appearance in print. Some of the Idols featured pre-1939 were Lord David Cecil and T. E. Lawrence; it was not until 1935 that the editors judged a woman worthy of being featured as an Idol – Lady Katharine Cairns being the first.

After the beginning of World War I, the Isis ceased publication for four years, until it was resurrected in 1919 by Beverley Nichols, who produced the opening issue entirely by himself:

"the great fact remains that Oxford is still here, a little dazed and unsteady perhaps, but Oxford all the same, and it is to sing of Oxford that The Isis appears once more, to reflect its every tendency, to echo its laughter and – well, to do the other thing."

Evelyn Waugh contributed to the magazine regularly. Waugh was also the first to participate in the rivalry between The Isis and the freshly established Cherwell by writing for both. The Isis was disparagingly referred to in the Cherwell as "The Was-Was".

The 1930s were times of much political turmoil in Europe, yet serene in the Isis - but then, so were they in the rest of the British press. A couple of articles more flippant than political in tone resulted in the Isis being banned in Germany in 1935. Only a year later, the magazine had again to suspend its operations until 1945, to re-emerge with new strength.

The H-bomb was a significant topic for debate in 1958, and the magazine published a whole issue on the subject consisting of unsigned articles. Two of the undergraduate contributors, William Miller and Paul Thompson, were both ex-national service, and wrote about British Intelligence operations on the borders of the Soviet Union. The two men were prosecuted under section 2 of the Official Secrets Act 1911, and sentenced to three months' imprisonment. As result, the proprietors at Holywell Press saw the need to step in, with the objection that the staff was now "definitely left-wing and will almost inevitably remain so."

The definite article dropped from its title, in the 1960s the Isis turned its guns on Oxford. In Michaelmas Term 1961 under Editor Paul Foot, the magazine began publishing reviews of university lectures. Of themselves the reviews attracted little interest outside the university. However, the decision of the university's Proctors to ban them triggered a national outcry. Three years later, under editor Chris Meakin, Isis had a second attempt. This time it succeeded and the Proctors, despite a fierce intellectual battle with the Editor using their Proctorial Summonses, at length found it simpler to back down under the spotlight of national newspaper interest. The debate revolved around the disagreement: who was doing more to "bring the name of the university into disrepute"? > > the reviews by exposing in public the worth of university lecturers > > or the Proctors by banning the reviews? Isis won. The Reviews then lasted for several terms until less-connected editors lost interest. Exceptionally the Editor also undertook the role of lead Oxford Union critic himself, as noted above a position of considerable influence around Oxford University from the magazine's earliest days.

For the Isis Idol in his term, Meakin prophetically chose the (much later) novelist Jeffrey Archer, who showed no literary flair whatever at Oxford and never wrote for the Isis. The magazine did not only criticise Oxford. One issue during that same term was mainly devoted to an on-the-spot examination of a controversial parliamentary election in the Birmingham-area constituency of Smethwick, where the widely criticised Conservative candidate Peter Griffiths was considered to have fought a racist campaign. To produce that particular issue, Isis took a coachload of undergraduate journalists to Birmingham for the day. The result was an edition of the magazine which was widely admired and which Paul Foot hailed as "one of the best things Isis has ever done." Following his editorship, Meakin produced a weekly satirical column "The Fifth Column", a title that has been borrowed numerous times since; it then took him about fifty years to produce his first novel The Chinese Ocean published in June 2015. It was probably a record delay for editors of the magazine; he followed this in 2017 with his non-fiction "The Origin of Economies."

Meantime the first of several attempted rescues came from businessman, Robert Maxwell, and his Pergamon Press on Headington Hill, Oxford. In a risky business move, a national student publication was created - Isis National, which began distribution in Spring 1964. The editor, Peter Gillman, mixed the customary Oxford news with subjects of broad appeal in cinema, the arts and elsewhere. One notable issue was devoted to the movie The Servant, directed by Joseph Losey and starring Dirk Bogarde, who were interviewed along with other cast members and technical crew. Gillman felt the editorial mix was appropriate but Maxwell's typically grandiose plan failed because he did not arrange a viable method of distribution. Maxwell departed in 1970, making the Isis an entirely independent and student-run company. The "University" tag was scrapped, and the Isis was also distributed at the Oxford Polytechnic in Headington (now Oxford Brookes University). Quite soon, the absence of solid financial backing caused the frequency of publication to be cut by half, and the Isis began to appear fortnightly. The following decades were interspersed with financial crises, the worst of which was a £1,000 printing bill in 1972 - and no cash to cover it with. Again, a rescue squad appeared from an unlikely, but illustrious source, in the form of this telegram:

"Read of your financial troubles in The Times STOP One thousand pounds will be en route as soon as you cable us name and address of printers at the Granotel Rome - Elizabeth Taylor and Richard Burton"

In 1998, after a series of growing financial crises, "Isis Publications Ltd" was created. Today the Isis is a termly magazine owned and published by Oxford Student Publications Ltd and is an anthology of poetry, investigations and art. The Isis also runs events for students in Oxford.

== Alumni ==
The Isis has been the springboard for careers in literature, the theatre and television, with specific influences in Private Eye and Westminster politics. Isis alumni include Hilaire Belloc, Evelyn Waugh, Harold Acton, Graham Greene, John Betjeman, Michael Foot, Jo Grimond, Sylvia Plath, Sue Lloyd-Roberts, playwright Dennis Potter, Adrian Mitchell, Charles Graves, Robert Robinson (the BBC broadcaster), Richard Ingrams (former editor of Private Eye), David Dimbleby (BBC Question Time), Paul Foot (former deputy editor of Private Eye), Ian Bradley (BBC and The Times), Alastair Macdonald (deputy Permanent Secretary at the Department for Trade and Industry), Derek Parfit (All Souls philosopher), Christopher Meakin (journalist, economist, banker), Peter Gillman (writer and journalist), Mary Kaldor (Professor at LSE), Sally Laird (writer, translator and editor), Gyles Brandreth (MP and entertainer) and Terry Jones (actor). Then in the "only four issues a term" era: George Osborne, Nigella Lawson, Jo Johnson and Ben Goldacre.

== Editors-in-Chief, 2000–present ==
| Year | Michaelmas | Hilary | Trinity |
|---|---|---|---|
| 2000-2001 | Benjamin Secher Gowan Tervo | Jude Bunting | Ben Hewitt Nell Freeman |
| 2001-2002 | Melissa Bradshaw Leander Deeney | Adrian Cornell du Houx | Phil Oltermann Ally Carnwath |
| 2002-2003 | Sean Gray Emma Farge | Mel Bradshaw Rodrigo Davies | N/A |
| 2003-2004 | N/A | Oliver Brown | Julia Buckley |
| 2004-2005 | Tess Andrews Torsten Henricson-Bell | Laura-Jane Foley Alice Jones | Mike Wakeman Noor Kadhim |
| 2005-2006 | Tom Pursey | Christopher Schuller | Georgina Warren |
| 2006-2007 | Alec Garton Ash | Ruth Lewy | Solvej Krause |
| 2007-2008 | Pippa Lamb | Adam White | Martyn Evans Lindsey Ford |
| 2008-2009 | Oskar Cox Jensen | James Kennard Maximilian Krahé | Jo Livingstone Rebecca Davis |
| 2009-2010 | Nick Coxon Jack Orlik | Ben Glazer Jack Marley-Payne | Tom Lazenby |
| 2010-2011 | Memphis Barker Joseph Charlton | Izzie Fraser Jim Waterson | Alex Dymoke Alex Macpherson |
| 2011-2012 | Jane Saldanha | Alex Hacillo | Douglas Sloan Sean Ayer |
| 2012-2013 | Rosie Ball Tom Gardner | Polina Ivanova William Granger | Philip Bell Rebecca Chong Wilkins |
| 2013-2014 | Violet Brand Daisy Fletcher | Aaron Payne Charlotte Sykes | Matt Broomfield Peter Endicott |
| 2014-2015 | Sadie Levy Gale Olivia Yallop | Raphael Hogarth Daniella Shreir | Huw Spencer Miranda Hall |
| 2015-2016 | Thea Slotover James Waddell | Alexander Hartley Ione Wells | Christian Hill Fintan Calpin |
| 2016-2017 | Eleanor Biggs Jacob Lee | Rosie Coleman Collier Samuel Dunnett | TJ Jordan Lily Begg |
| 2017-2018 | Flo Ward Lael Hines | Joe Higton Durrant Tobi Thomas | Emily Lawford Jiaqi Kang |
| 2018-2019 | Katie Meynell Lev Crofts | Jorrit Donner-Wittkopf Leela Jadhav | Antonio Perricone Leo Gadaski |
| 2019-2020 | Léa Gayer de Mena Zehra Munir | Annabelle Fuller Neil Natarajan | Chung Kiu Kwok Ivana Cholakova |
| 2020-2021 | Alexander Haveron-Jones Barnaby Pite | Mukahang Limbu Rita Kimijima-Dennemeyer | Nat Cheung Kalli Dockrill |
| 2021-2022 | Anya Li Taira Natalie Perman | Joseph Dobbyn Grace Lawrence | Ananya Basu Kiana Rezakhanlou |
| 2022-2023 | Susie Castledine Dowon Jung | Shao Yi Wong Mia Wu | Clemmie Read Antara Singh |
| 2023-2024 | Isaaq Tomkins Zoe Davies | Flavius Covaci Caitlin Morgan | Helen Edwards Clara Hartley |
| 2024-2025 | Ananya Saraf Bella Gerber-Johnstone | Alice Robey-Cave Violet Aitchison | Lina Osman Joseph Rodgers |
| 2025-2026 | Finbarr Currie Gruffydd Price | Phoebe Barnett Josephine Hynes | Gabriella Ofo Phoebe Birch |
| 2026-2027 | Sharon Xuanling Zhang Josephine Stern | | |

== Sources ==
- The Isis website
- Billen, Andrew and Skipworth, Mark. Oxford Type. Robson Books, 1984.
