= Oxford Student Publications Limited =

Student publishing house at the University of Oxford

- Type: Limited Company
- Industry: Publishing
- Founded: 1961
- Headquarters: Office Suite B, Salter's Yard, Folly Bridge, Oxford
- Key people: Petra Dijur (Chairperson)
- Products: Cherwell (student newspaper); The Isis (arts and literary magazine); The Oxford Scientist (science journal and magazine); Industry (visual magazine); PHASER (music magazine)
- Website: ospl.org

Oxford Student Publications Limited (OSPL) is an independent student publishing house in Oxford that publishes the Cherwell student newspaper, The Isis student magazine, The Oxford Scientist, formerly Bang Science Magazine, PHASER, Keep Off the Grass freshers' magazine and Industry fashion magazine.

The company is wholly independent and is run entirely by students of the University of Oxford. In 1961, OSPL was established as a holding company for Cherwell newspaper and acquired the Isis brand in the late 1990s. The business is a private company limited by guarantee and registered at Companies House.

OSPL's income comes from subscriptions and advertising; the company receives no subsidy from Oxford University. All profits are put back into media production and into ensuring the long-term well-being of the company. Very few major student newspapers operate in this fashion.

== Notable alumni ==
Notable journalistic/editorial contributors to Cherwell newspaper and Isis magazine are listed elsewhere. Notable alumni once involved in OSPL's business activities include:

- Michael Heseltine, Haymarket chairman and Conservative peer;
- Rupert Murdoch, chairman and CEO of News Corporation;
- John Redwood, former Conservative leadership contender
- Katie Ghose, Chairman of OSPL in 1990 and Chief Executive of the Electoral Reform Society.
- Felicity Cloake, freelance food journalist, Guardian columnist and author of several cookbooks.
