= Mostyn Pigott =

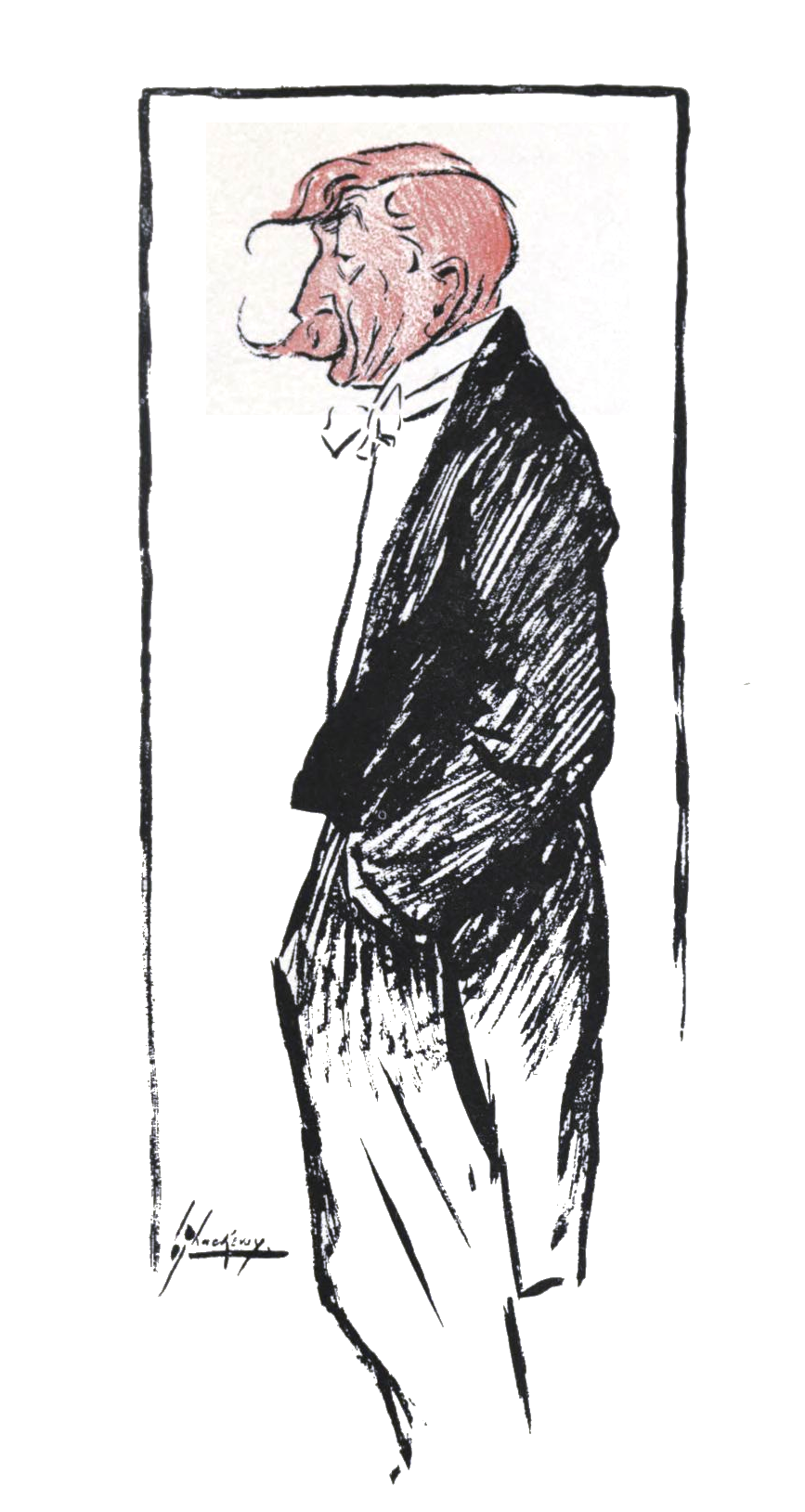
Caricature by Lance Thackery, 1907

Montague Horatio Mostyn Turtle Pigott (9 August 1865 – 26 August 1927) was an English barrister and writer of humorous plays and poems. He was a founding editor of The Isis. He also wrote under the pen name "Medium Tem Plum" and "Testudo" and was popular at the Savage and Beefsteak Clubs.

== Life and work ==
Pigott was born in London the son of Rebecca and Robert Temple Pigott. He was educated at Westminster School before going to University College, Oxford. He was called to the Bar at the Middle Temple in 1890. He worked as a Barrister-at-Law and was active in literary circles. At Oxford he founded The Isis which he edited in 1892. It was meant to be a light-hearted commentary on university life and he stated that "We shall endeavour to be humorous without being ill-humoured, critical without being captious, militant without being malevolent, independent without being impertinent, and funny." He was associated with the Royal Temple Yacht, Beefsteak, Sphinx and Savage Clubs and was known for his after-dinner speeches.

Pigott wrote a range of verse, ditties, and some plays. One of his pieces in rhyme form was called the hundred best books.

Pigott died from chest trouble at a Denham House Nursing Home in Ramsgate.
