= Joseph Bradshaw =

Joseph or Joe Bradshaw may refer to:

- Joseph Bradshaw (VC) (1835–1893), Irish recipient of the Victoria Cross
- Joseph Bradshaw (footballer) (1860–1933), English football manager
- Joe Bradshaw (footballer) (1884–?), English football manager
- Joe Bradshaw (baseball) (1897–1985), American baseball player
- Joseph Bradshaw (pastoralist) (1854–1916), Australian pastoralist

== See also ==
- Bradshaw (surname)
