= Roy Bradshaw =

Roy Bradshaw may refer to:

- Roy Bradshaw (geographer) (born 1943), English professor of geography
- Roy Bradshaw (figure skater), British figure skater
