= Cat Sense =

2013 book by John Bradshaw

- First edition (UK)
- Author: John Bradshaw
- Language: English
- Series: Animal Sense
- Genre: Documentary
- Publisher: Allen Lane
- Publication date: August 15, 2013
- Publication place: United States; United Kingdom
- Media type: Print, e-book
- Pages: 272 pages
- ISBN: 0241960460
- Preceded by: Dog Sense

Cat Sense is a 2013 non-fiction book written by John Bradshaw. It was published on August 15, 2013, and was chosen by The New York Times as one of its best-sellers in 2013. It was also publicly well received and praised for its humorist approach to its subject: cat psychology. Major newspapers and radios gave good reviews. NPR, for example, included it as an NPR Staff Pick on their "Guide to 2013's Great Reads."
