= Ann Bradshaw =

Ann Bradshaw may refer to:

- Ann Bradshaw, fictional character in the Gemma Doyle Trilogy
- Ann Maria Bradshaw (1801–1862), English actress and vocalist
- Ann Bradshaw (swimmer) (born 1957), British Olympic swimmer
