= Robert Bradshaw =

Robert Bradshaw may refer to:

- Robert Llewellyn Bradshaw (1916–1978), former Premier and Chief Minister of Saint Kitts and Nevis, labor activist
- Robert Bradshaw (figure skater) (1954–1996), American figure skater
- Robert Haldane Bradshaw (1759–1835), agent to Francis Egerton, 3rd Duke of Bridgewater
- Robert C. Bradshaw (1840–1927), Union Army general during the American Civil War
- Robert Bradshaw (rugby union) (1861–1907), Irish international rugby union player

== See also ==
- Robert L. Bradshaw International Airport, Saint Kitts
