= Ian Bradshaw (photographer) =

American photographer and picture editor

- Occupation: Photographer

Ian Bradshaw is an American freelance photographer and picture editor.

His most famous image is The Twickenham Streaker, taken in February 1974 of Michael O’Brien being led away by police after streaking at an England-France rugby match at Twickenham. Crucial to the image's success was that it was taken when a policeman's helmet was positioned at the exact spot on O'Brien's body to allow the photograph to be published in the mainstream media without alteration. The image won LIFE magazine's "Picture of the Year" award, People Magazine Picture of The Decade and a World Press Photo Award.

War photographer Don McCullin said in 2006 that it is the one image that he wished he had taken.

He returned to the United States in 1999 and now specializes in education photography.
