= Harry Bradshaw (rugby league) =

England international rugby league footballer

Personal information
- Full name: Harold Bradshaw

Playing information
- Position: Hooker
Club
Years	Team	Pld	T	G	FG	P
≤1953–53	Dewsbury
1953–57	Huddersfield
	Dewsbury
	Total	0	0	0	0	0
Representative
Years	Team	Pld	T	G	FG	P
1953	England	1	0	0	0	0
- Relatives: Bill Bradshaw (brother)

Harry Bradshaw is an English World Cup winning former professional rugby league footballer who played in the 1950s. He played at representative level for England, and at club level for Dewsbury and Huddersfield, as a hooker.

== Playing career ==
=== Club career ===
Bradshaw played for Dewsbury until December 1953, when he was signed by Huddersfield. He then returned to Dewsbury in November 1957.

=== International honours ===
Bradshaw won a cap for England while at Dewsbury in 1953 against Other Nationalities.

Bradshaw was also selected for the Great Britain squad while at Huddersfield for the 1954 Rugby League World Cup in France. However, he did not participate in any of the four matches, with Sam Smith playing as Hooker in all four matches.
