= Thomas Bradshaw (poet) =

English poet

Thomas Bradshaw (born 1562) was an English poet, the author of The Shepherd's Starre, published in 1591.

Bradshaw was baptised on 25 September 1562. His father, also Thomas Bradshaw, was Headmaster of the King's School, Worcester; his mother was a daughter of Guthlac Edwards MP. He matriculated at Brasenose College, Oxford on 18 July 1580, aged 17. (Note: Craze notes that the Dictionary of National Biography, which identifies a Thomas Bradshaw graduating M.A. at Oxford in 1549, confuses Bradshaw with his father.)

== The Shepherd's Starre ==
The Shepherd's Starre begins: "Now of late scene and at this hower to be obserued, merueilous orient in the East: which bringeth glad tydings to all that may behold her brightnes, having the foure elements with the foure capitall vertues in her, which makes her elementall and a vanquishor of all earthly humors." Then follows a dedication to "The Right Honorables, and puissant Barons, Robert Deuereux Earle of Essex, and unto Thomas Lord Burgh". Next comes a prose address to the author from his brother and publisher, Alexander. Then follows a group of letters: (1) "I. M. Esquier, his farewell to England and to the Author", (2) "The Author's farewell to England, and to his most intier friend I. M.", and (3) "T. G. Esquire his replye to the farewell of the Author".

The bulk of the volume consists of A Paraphrase upon the Third of the Canticles of Theocritus, in both verse and prose. The author's style in the preface is highly affected and euphuistic, but the Theocritean paraphrase reads pleasantly. The book is of great rarity; but there is a copy in the British Museum.
