= Roy Bradshaw (geographer) =

British geographer

Dr. Roy Bradshaw (born 1943) is an associate professor of geography at the University of Nottingham. His main areas of research and teaching include: Economic geography; retailing; regional geography (East European studies and Iberian Peninsula). He is currently researching environmental problems in Russia; economic and social impact of borderlands; use of qualitative methods in Geography and Interpreting Geographical Data.

Roy Bradshaw attended High Wycombe Royal Grammar School (U.K.) from 1956 to 1962 and graduated from Keele University in Geography and Economics.

== Publications ==
- Bradshaw, R., Manning, N. and Thompstone, S. (Eds.) (2003) After the Fall: Central and Eastern Europe since the Collapse of Communism, Olearius Press
- Bradshaw, R. (2003) 'Environmental problems in Russia and the former Soviet Union', In (Eds, Bradshaw, R., Manning, N. and Thompstone, S.), After the Fall: Central and Eastern Europe since the Collapse of Communism Olearius Press.
- Bradshaw, R., Abrahart, R. J., Priestnall, G. and Conway, G. (2003) ' Building Digital Derby 1841' In Historical Geography Section, 28th Annual meeting of the Social Science History Association Baltimore, Maryland, USA.
