= Twickenham Stadium =

Stadium in London, England

Twickenham Stadium Allianz Stadium Twickenham
- Billy Williams' Cabbage Patch; The Cabbage Patch; Twickers; Headquarters; HQ; The Big Stoop

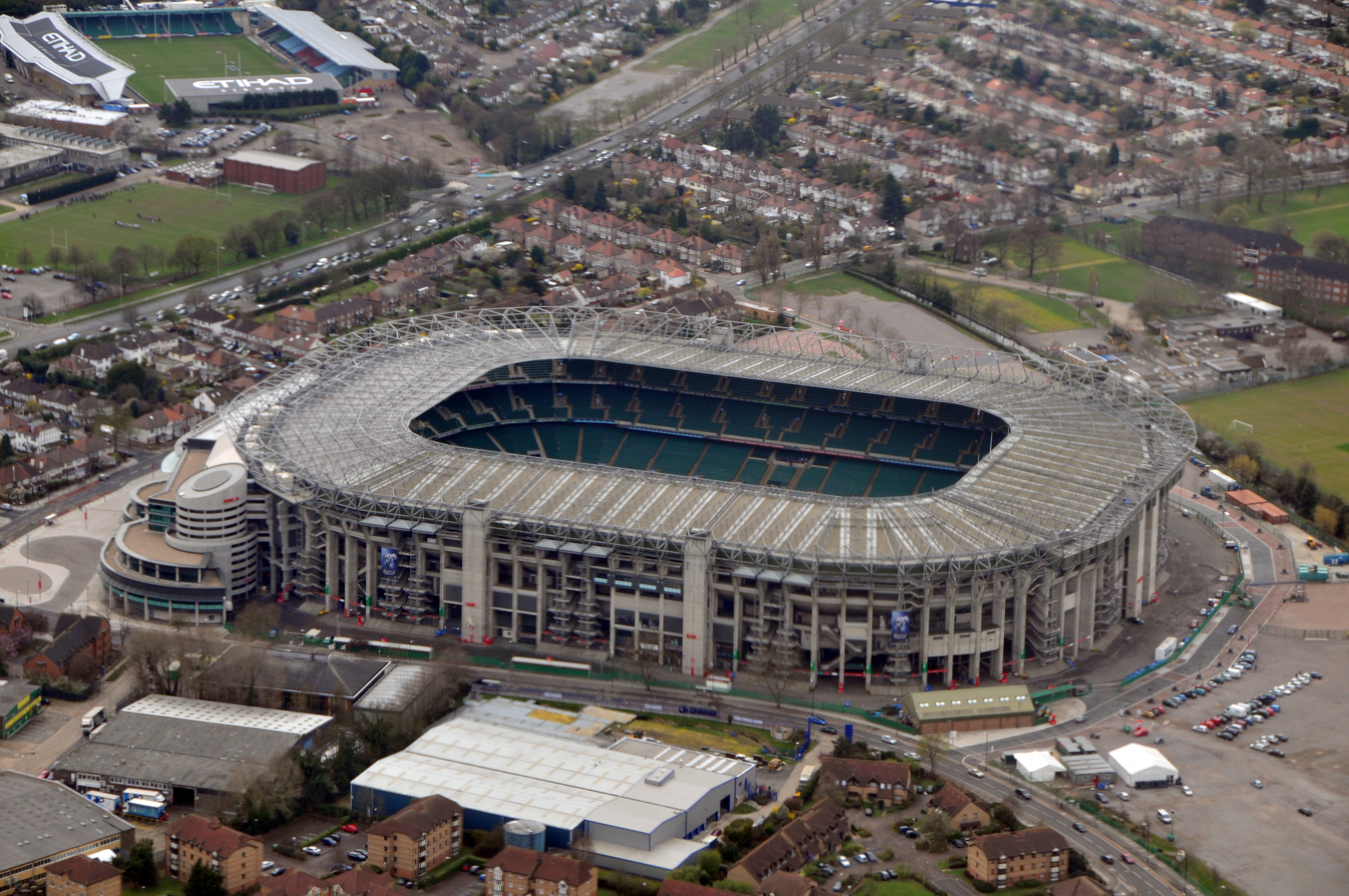
- Aerial view of Twickenham Stadium
- Interactive map of Twickenham Stadium; Allianz Stadium Twickenham
- Address: 200 Whitton Road; Twickenham; TW2 7BA
- Location: London, England
- Coordinates: 51°27′21″N 0°20′29″W
- Owner: RFU
- Capacity: 82,000 (rugby); 75,000 (American football); 55,000 (concerts; limited)
- Executive suites: 150
- Surface: Desso GrassMaster
- Field size: 125 m × 70 m
- Public transit: Twickenham

Construction
- Built: 1907; 119 years ago
- Opened: 2 October 1909; 117 years ago
- Renovated: 2005–2008
- Architect: John Bradley

Tenants
- England national rugby union team Harlequins (2008–present; selected matches); Bath Rugby (2017–2019, selected matches)

Website
- allianzstadiumtwickenham.com

Twickenham Stadium (/ˈtwɪkənəm/; usually known as Twickenham, and for sponsorship purposes known as the Allianz Stadium Twickenham) is a rugby union stadium in Twickenham, London, England. It is owned by the Rugby Football Union (RFU), the English rugby union governing body, which has its headquarters there. The stadium is England's national rugby union stadium and is the venue for the England national rugby union team's home matches.

Twickenham is the second largest stadium in the United Kingdom (behind Wembley Stadium), and the fourth largest in Europe. The Middlesex Sevens, Premiership Rugby fixtures, Anglo-Welsh Cup matches, Harlequins' annual Big Game, the Varsity Match between Oxford and Cambridge universities and European Rugby Champions Cup games have been played there. It has also been used as the venue for the Rugby Football League's Challenge Cup Final in 2001 and 2006, and the NFL London Games in 2016 and 2017.

The stadium has hosted concerts by artists such as Rihanna, Iron Maiden, Bryan Adams, Bon Jovi, Genesis, U2, Beyoncé, the Rolling Stones, the Police, Eagles, R.E.M., Eminem, Lady Gaga, Metallica, Depeche Mode and NSPPD Prayer Conference.

== Overview ==
Twickenham hosts England's home Six Nations matches, as well as games against touring teams from the Southern Hemisphere, usually annually in November.

Apart from its relationship with the national team, Twickenham is the venue for a number of other domestic and international rugby union matches. It hosts the annual London leg of the World Rugby Sevens Series, the Cup (championship) final, the third-place match of the annual London leg of the World Rugby Women's Sevens Series, and the domestic Middlesex Sevens competition. It is also the venue for the Premiership Rugby final as well as Harlequins' Big Game at Christmas time and an additional annual fixture hosted by Harlequins in late spring. Anglo-Welsh Cup, Heineken Cup and Champions Cup finals have been held here, and the stadium also hosts The Varsity Match between Oxford and Cambridge (1921–2023), the English schools' Daily Mail Cup Final and the Army Navy Match, which forms the culmination of the annual Inter-Services Competition.

=== Regular events ===
Event	Approximate dates
England rugby union team home games of Six Nations Championship	February and March
One England women's rugby union team home game of Women's Six Nations Championship	March and April
Harlequin's Big Summer Kick-off	Early May
Army Navy Match	Mid May
Premiership Rugby Final	Late May or June
England rugby union team games of the Autumn internationals	October and November
Harlequin's Big Game	Late December

== History ==
Sold-out Tests against New Zealand and South Africa at Crystal Palace saw the RFU realise the benefit of owning their own ground. Committee member William Williams and treasurer William Cail led the way to purchasing a 10.25 acre (4 hectare) market garden in Twickenham in 1907 for £5,500 12s 6d. The first stands were constructed the following year. Before the ground was purchased, it was used to grow, among other vegetables, cabbages, and so Twickenham Stadium is affectionately known as the Cabbage Patch. After further expenditure on roads, the first game, between Harlequins v. Richmond, was played on 2 October 1909, and the first international, England v. Wales, on 15 January 1910. At the time of the England-Wales game, the stadium had a maximum capacity of 20,000 spectators. During World War I, the ground was used for cattle, horse and sheep grazing. King George V unveiled a war memorial in 1921.

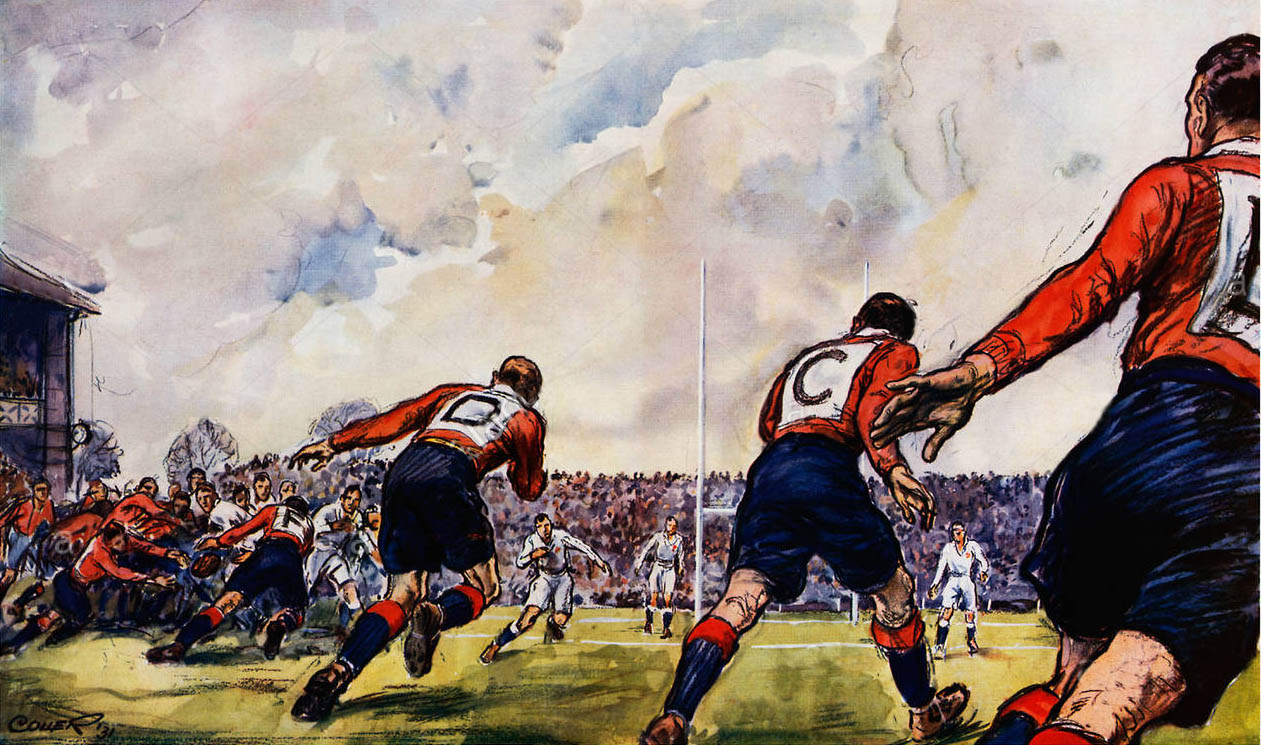
Starting an Attack, painting of the England v Wales rugby union match at Twickenham in 1931

In 1926, the first Middlesex Sevens took place at the ground. In 1927 the first Varsity Match took place at Twickenham for the first time. On 19 March 1938, BBC Television broadcast the England – Scotland (Calcutta Cup) match from Twickenham, the first time that a rugby match was shown live on television. In 1959, to mark 50 years of the ground, a combined side of England and Wales beat Ireland and Scotland by 26 points to 17.

Coming into the last match of the 1988 season, England had lost 15 of their previous 23 matches in the Five Nations Championship. The Twickenham crowd had only seen one England try in the previous two years, and at half-time the team were 0–3 down against Ireland. During the second half, England started playing an expansive game many had doubted they were capable of producing. A 0–3 deficit was turned into a 35–3 win, with England scoring six tries. This day also saw the origins of the adoption of the traditional spiritual "Swing Low, Sweet Chariot" as a terrace song. Three of England's tries in the match were scored by Chris Oti, a black player who had made a reputation for himself that season as speedy left winger. A group of boys from the Benedictine school Douai, following a tradition at their school games, sang "Swing Low, Sweet Chariot" whenever a try was scored. When Oti scored his second try, amused spectators standing close to the boys joined in, and when Oti scored his hat-trick the song was heard around the ground. Since then "Swing Low, Sweet Chariot" has been a song to sing at England home games, in the same way that Fields of Athenry is sung in Dublin and Cwm Rhondda is sung in Cardiff.

The United Kingdom, Ireland and France shared the hosting of the 1991 Rugby World Cup. Twickenham was used during pool A England matches. Twickenham was also host of the 1991 Rugby World Cup Final in which Australia beat England 12–6. For this game, England changed their style of play, opting for the sort of running game that had brought them victory against Ireland in the March 1988 game referred to above. During this match, with the English facing a 12–3 deficit, David Campese reached one-handed for a ball thrown to England winger, Rory Underwood. He dropped it and the ball rolled forward, gifting England a penalty that proved to be the last score of the game. Some have claimed that Campese's action should have been interpreted as a deliberate professional foul, with possible disciplinary action against the Australian player. However, on the same ground in November 1988, Campese had intercepted a similar pass and run the length of the field to score a try.

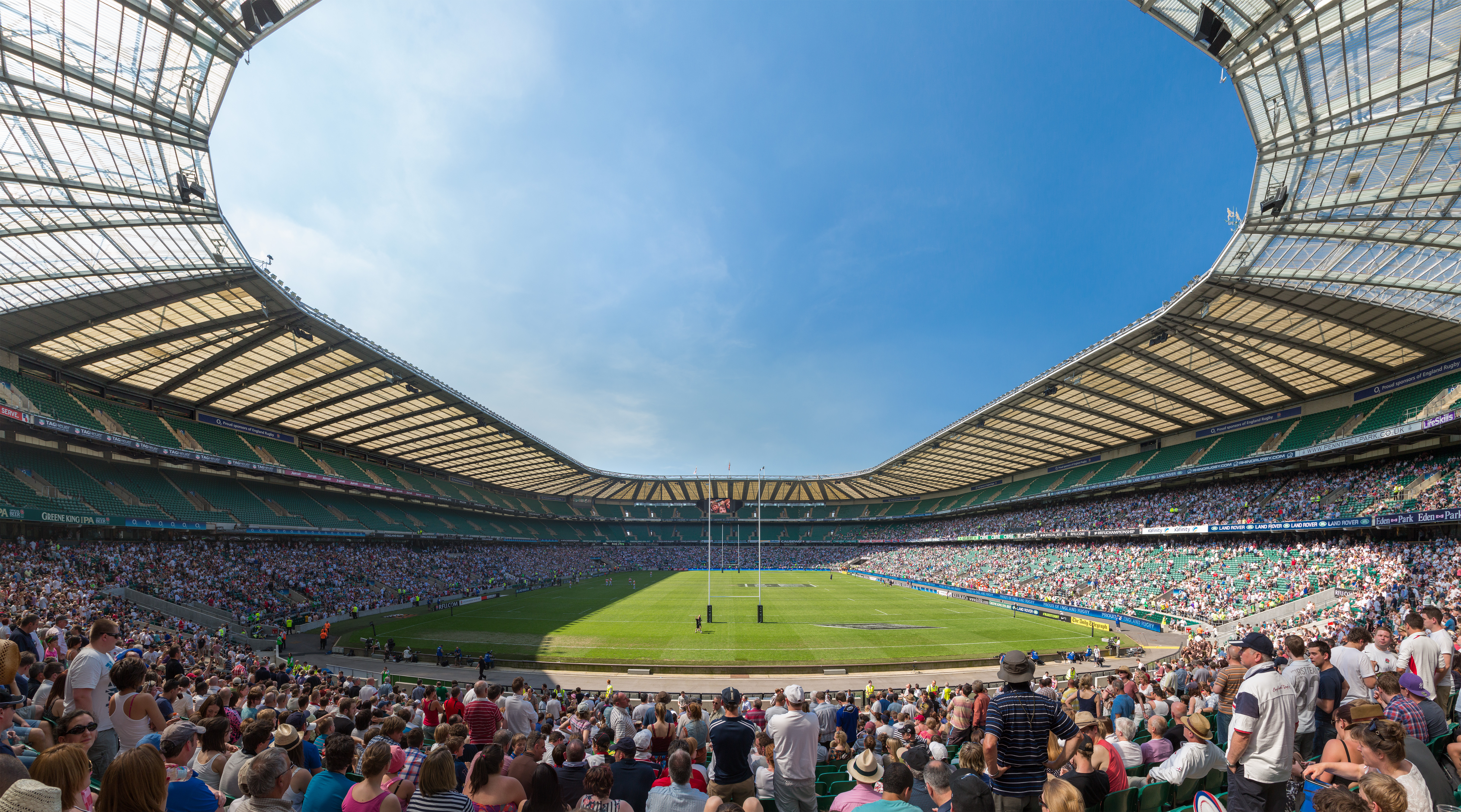
The interior of Twickenham Stadium in 2012

Some of the Welsh-hosted 1999 Rugby World Cup games were taken to Twickenham. These included three of England's pool B matches, the second round playoff when England defeated Fiji 45 points to 24, and both semi-finals, none of which England were involved in, having made their exit in the quarter-finals at the hands of South Africa. Under the reign of Clive Woodward, the stadium became known as 'Fortress Twickenham', as England enjoyed a run of 19 unbeaten home matches from October 1999, ending with defeat against Ireland in 2004. The IRB Rugby Aid Match was played on 5 March 2005 under the auspices of the International Rugby Board (IRB) to raise money for the United Nations World Food Programme to support its work helping victims of the 2004 Indian Ocean tsunami. The match was between representative sides of the Northern and Southern hemispheres, with the Southern side winning 54–19.

In 2008, Harlequins once again became tenants at Twickenham for selected matches including the annual Big Game fixture usually hosted in late December each year. In 2022, the club launched a second annual fixture at the ground hosted each summer annually known as The Big Summer Kick Off.

In May 2023 during the 2023 Premiership Rugby Final between Sale Sharks and Saracens a group of Just Stop Oil protesters came onto the pitch and started to vandalise the surface. Some of the players helped security staff to remove the protestors, who were later arrested.

On 5 August 2024, Twickenham Stadium announced that the stadium would be renamed to the Allianz Stadium Twickenham for 10 years from September 2024, due to a sponsorship agreement with Allianz.

== Redevelopment ==
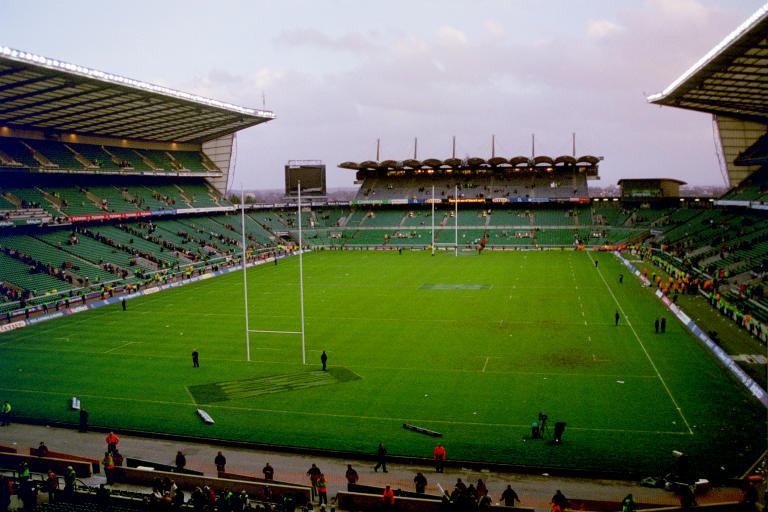
The South Stand before redevelopment, April 2004

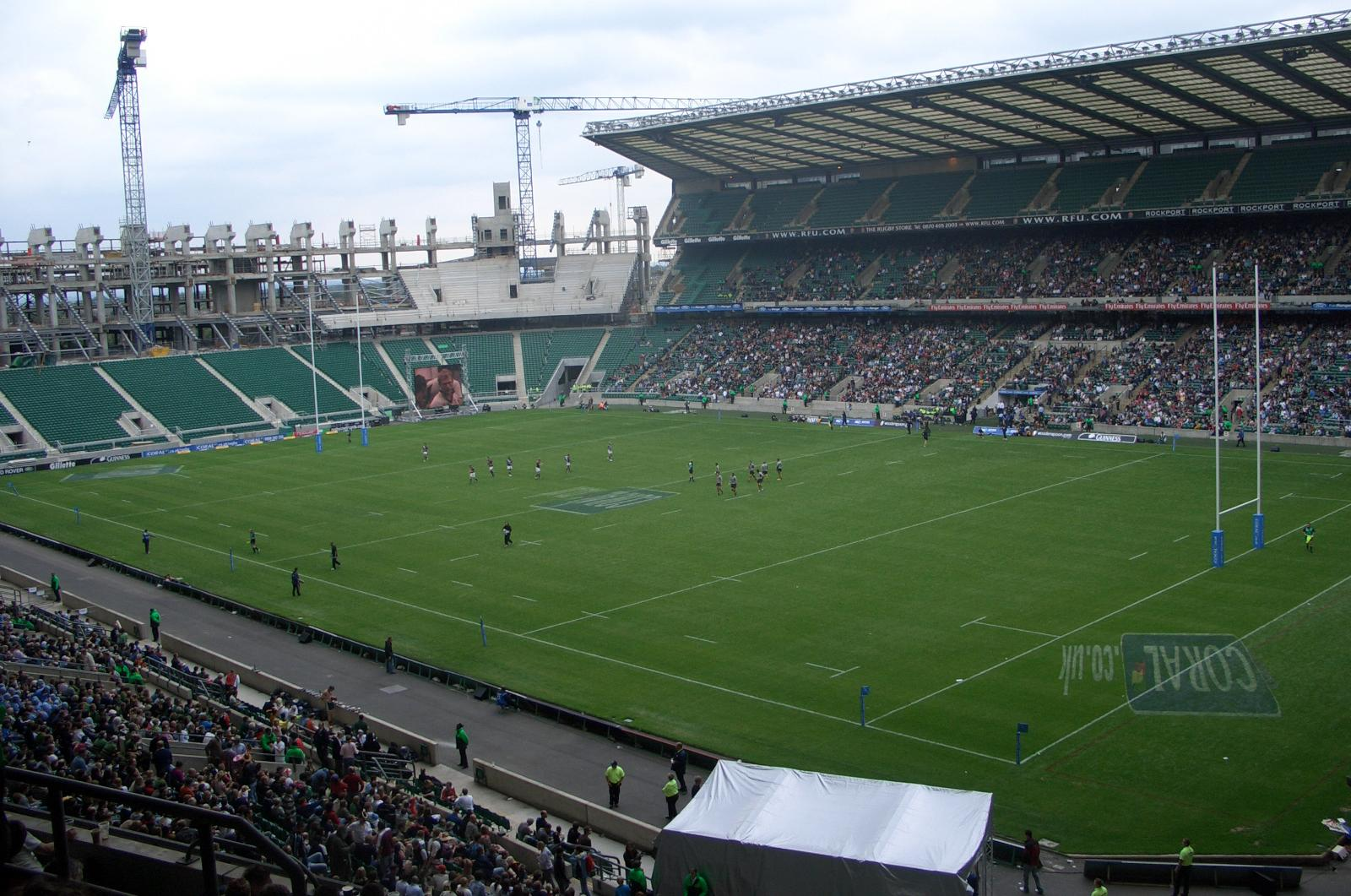
The South Stand during redevelopment

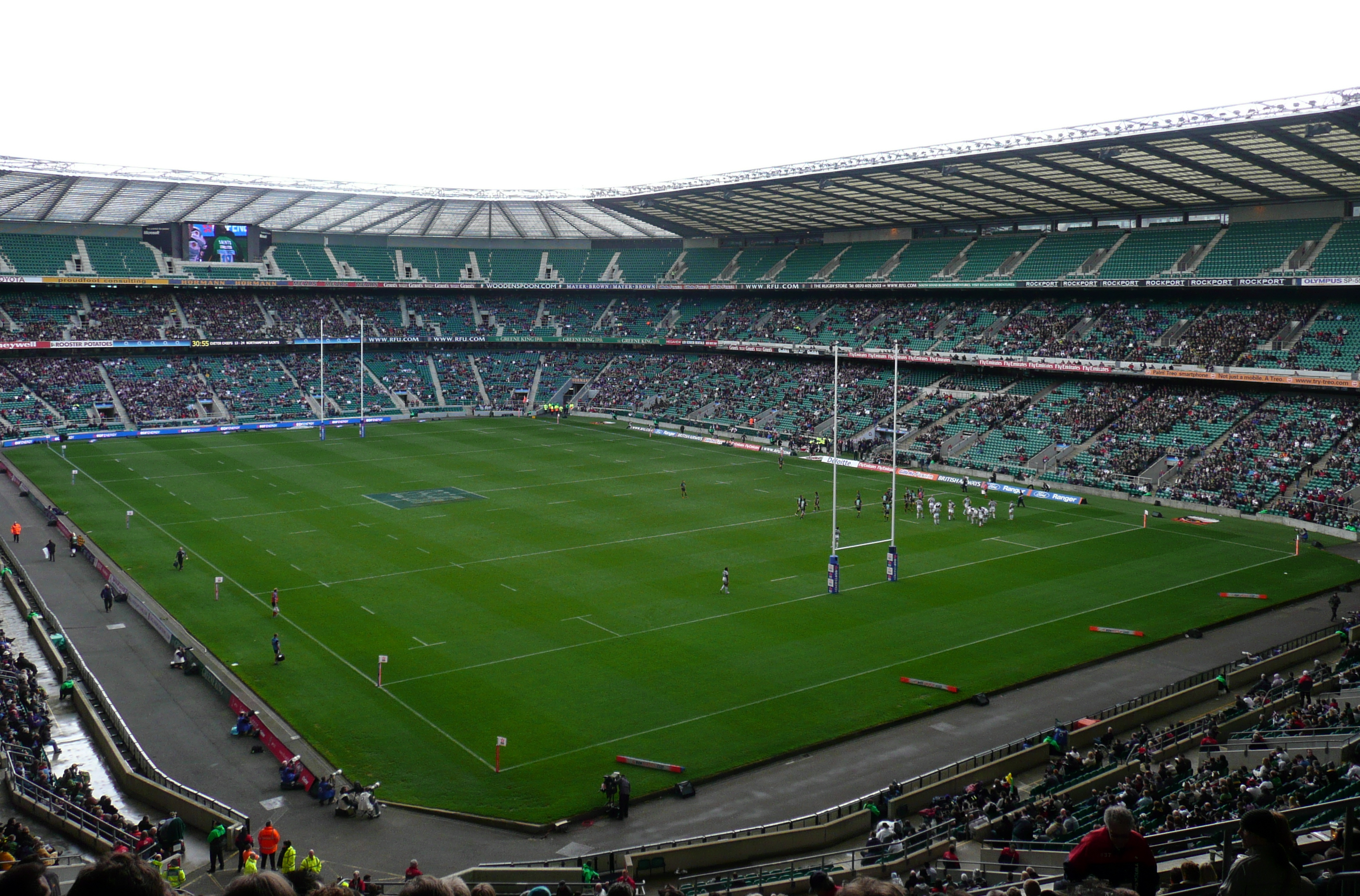
The South Stand after redevelopment, April 2008

Since the ground's purchase by the RFU in 1907, it has gone through a number of redevelopments. In 1921, a stand was built above the northern terrace, with workshops placed underneath. In 1927, the East Stand was extended, bringing the capacity to 12,000. The south terrace was later extended to enable crowds of 20,000. In 1932, a new West Stand was completed, providing offices for the RFU, who made the ground their home. In 1937, Middlesex County Council approved a scheme submitted by Twickenham Borough Council to widen Rugby Road due to it being inadequate for traffic.

In 1965, the South Terrace was closed due to structural failings. It was found to be cheaper to build a new stand than to repair the existing one; however, planning permission was refused, due to objections from local residents. Permission was eventually granted in 1978. A period of extensive rebuilding took place during the early 1980s, which continued through to the mid-1990s. In 1981, the South Terrace was rebuilt as the South Stand. After being taken down in 1989, an extended North Stand was opened in 1990, having been designed by Husband & Co, and built by Mowlem. Following the 1992 Five Nations, the stadium saw the development of the new East Stand and subsequently the West Stand, to essentially the same design as the North Stand. In 1995, the stadium redevelopment was completed, the ground now accommodating 75,000 people in an all-seater environment. The North, East and West stands were all built by Mowlem. Planning permission was sought in 2002 and received in December 2004 for a new South Stand to further raise capacity, with building work commencing in June 2005. As well as increasing the stadium's capacity to 82,000, the redevelopment introduced a four-star Marriott hotel with 156 rooms and six VIP suites with views over the field, a performing arts complex, a health and leisure club, a new rugby shop and a general increase in function space. In July 2005, the old south stand was demolished to make way for the new development. The festivities that were planned to mark this were cancelled in the wake of the 7 July terror attacks in the centre of London. The new seating, which had been started by Mowlem, was completed by Carillion on 5 November 2006 in time for the England vs New Zealand game of that year's autumn internationals series, in which England lost in a near-record defeat.

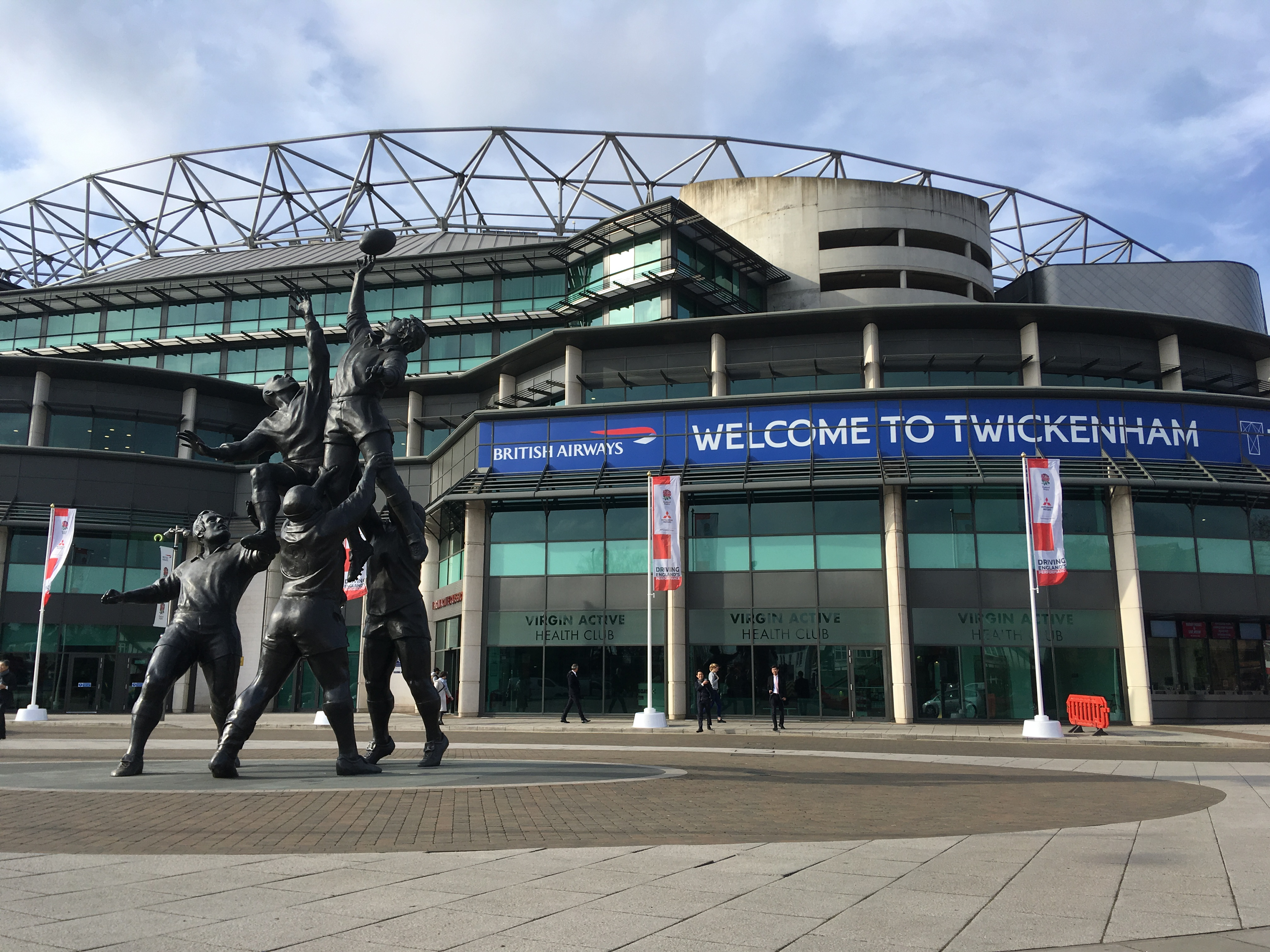
The East Stand redevelopment completed in 2018.

The rugby stadium continued to be developed into 2018 with the upgrading of the east stand. The new stand offers match-day hospitality as well as six floors of event spacing. The east stand was over budget due to additional safety measures put in place to make the redeveloped structure capable of withstanding a bomb attack, and to make it fireproof, with work carried out on the cladding in response to the Grenfell Tower fire. Following the upgrade, the roof is now complete.

== Rugby World Cup ==
Twickenham Stadium has hosted Rugby World Cup Matches in 1991, 1999 and 2015, including the finals in 1991 and 2015 when England were the host nation. The Stadium also hosted semi-finals in 1999, including France's famous 43–31 victory over New Zealand. In August 2023, the stadium was confirmed as one of eight host venues for the 2025 Women's Rugby World Cup.

=== 1991 Rugby World Cup ===
Stage	Team 1	Score	Team 2
Pool A	England	12–18	New Zealand
Pool A	England	36–6	Italy
Pool A	England	37–9	United States
Final	England	6–12	Australia

=== 1999 Rugby World Cup ===
Stage	Team 1	Score	Team 2
Pool B	England	67–7	Italy
Pool B	England	16–30	New Zealand
Pool B	England	101–10	Tonga
Quarter-final play-off	England	45–24	Fiji
Semi-final	Australia	27–21	South Africa
Semi-final	France	43–31	New Zealand

=== 2015 Rugby World Cup ===
Stage	Team 1	Score	Team 2
Pool A	England	35–11	Fiji
Pool A	England	25–28	Wales
Pool A	England	13–33	Australia
Pool A	Australia	15–6	Wales
Pool D	France	32–10	Italy
Quarter-final	South Africa	23–19	Wales
Quarter-final	Australia	35–34	Scotland
Semi-final	South Africa	18–20	New Zealand
Semi-final	Argentina	15–29	Australia
Final	New Zealand	34–17	Australia

=== 2025 Women's Rugby World Cup ===
The stadium was one of eight host venues for the 2025 Women's Rugby World Cup and hosted the final of the competition on 27 September 2025.

2025 Women's Rugby World Cup matches held at Twickenham Stadium
Date	Country	Score	Country	Stage	Attendance	Ref
27 September 2025	France	26–42	New Zealand	Bronze final		
27 September 2025	England	33–13	Canada	Final	81,885	

== Other uses ==
=== Concerts ===
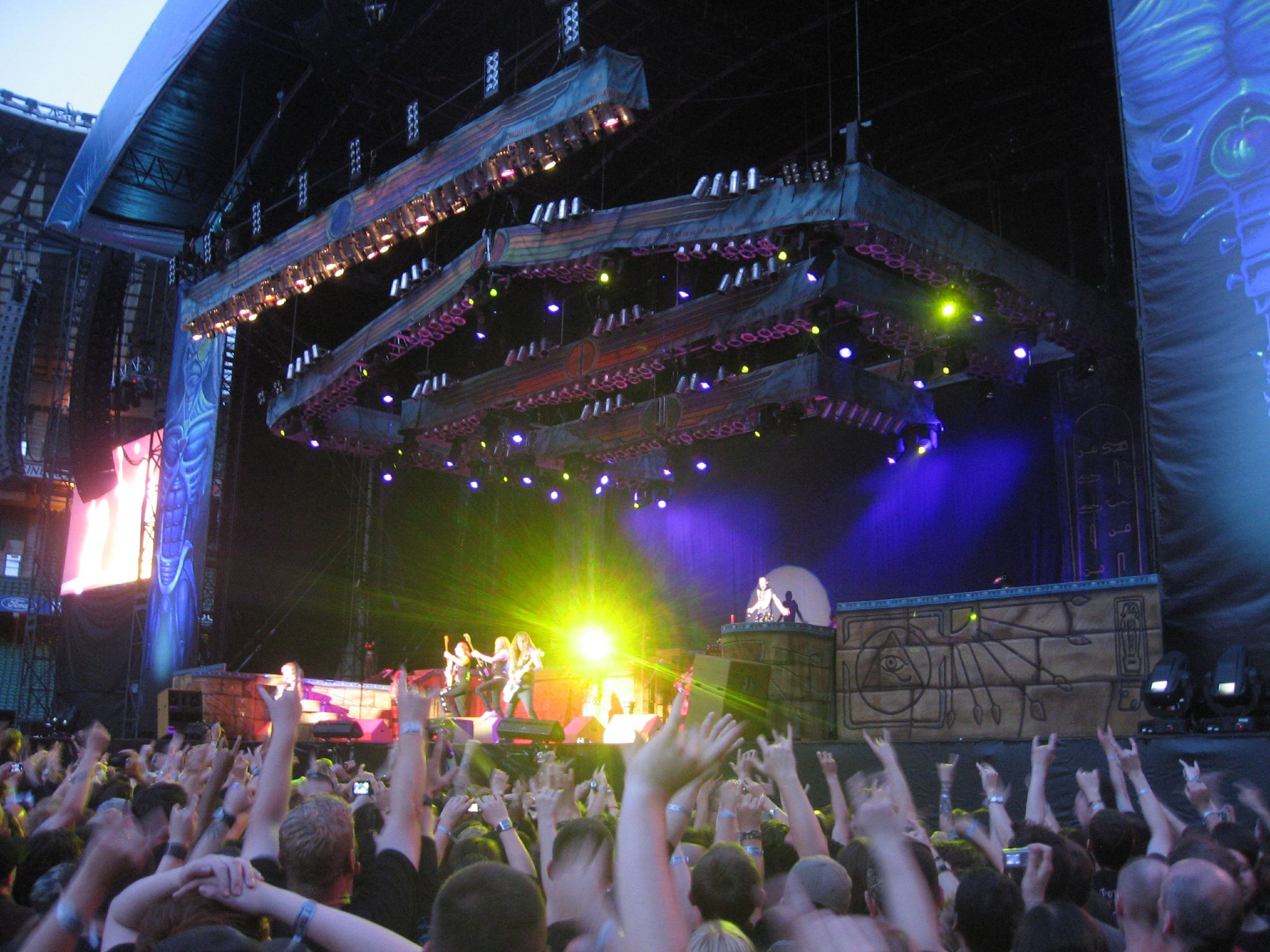
An Iron Maiden concert in 2008

Due to the construction delays of Wembley, a number of scheduled events at Wembley were moved to Twickenham. The Rolling Stones' A Bigger Bang Tour concerts were taken to Twickenham. The Rolling Stones played two shows at Twickenham in August and September 2003, the first of which was used as their stadium concert disc for the 2003 DVD Four Flicks. In 2007, Genesis played at Twickenham during their reunion tour. Rod Stewart played at the stadium in June 2007 and The Police in September 2007. The usual capacity for concerts is up to 55,000, as opposed to the 82,000 for rugby.

New Jersey rockers Bon Jovi played two shows at Twickenham in June 2008 as part of their Lost Highway Tour, and Iron Maiden played there as part of their Somewhere Back in Time World Tour on 5 July 2008, along with a full supporting bill which included Avenged Sevenfold, Within Temptation and Lauren Harris. R.E.M. performed at Twickenham in August 2008.

On 8 and 9 September 2012, Lady Gaga performed two sold-out shows at the stadium during her Born This Way Ball Tour with 101,250 people in combined attendance. 50,625 tickets for the first show sold out in 50 seconds, which broke the record for the fastest sold-out stadium show in British history.

On 15 and 16 June 2013, Rihanna performed two shows at the stadium during her Diamonds World Tour for 95,971 people combined.

Since the mid-1950s, Twickenham hosts the Jehovah's Witnesses annual convention for the London area. Usually, up to 25,000 attend to hear Bible talks.

In 2025, the stadium′s operator asked to increase the number of non-sporting events allowed each year from three to up to 15, and to raise the attendance limit for those events to 75,000 people.

Date	Performer(s)	Opening act(s)	Tour/Event	Attendance	Notes
24 August 2003	The Rolling Stones		Licks Tour		
20 September 2003	The Rolling Stones		Licks Tour		
18 June 2005	U2	Doves, Idlewild, Athlete, Ash	Vertigo Tour	110,796	
19 June 2005	U2	Doves, Idlewild, Athlete, Ash	Vertigo Tour	110,796	
17 June 2006	Eagles		Farewell 1 Tour		
20 August 2006	The Rolling Stones	Feeder	A Bigger Bang	100,540	
22 August 2006	The Rolling Stones	The Charlatans	A Bigger Bang	100,540	
30 June 2007	Rod Stewart		Greatest Hits		
8 July 2007	Genesis		Turn It On Again: The Tour	54,279	
27 June 2008	Bon Jovi	Biffy Clyro	Lost Highway Tour	92,852	
28 June 2008	Bon Jovi	The Feeling	Lost Highway Tour	92,852	
5 July 2008	Iron Maiden	Avenged Sevenfold, Within Temptation, Lauren Harris	Somewhere Back in Time World Tour	55,000	
30 August 2008	R.E.M.		Accelerate Tour		
8 September 2007	The Police	Maxïmo Park, Fiction Plane	The Police Reunion Tour	104,417	
9 September 2007	The Police	Maxïmo Park, Fiction Plane	The Police Reunion Tour	104,417	
12 September 2010	Various artists		Help For Heroes Concert		
8 September 2012	Lady Gaga	The Darkness, Lady Starlight	Born This Way Ball	101,250	
9 September 2012	Lady Gaga	The Darkness, Lady Starlight	Born This Way Ball	101,250	
1 June 2013	Various artists		Sound of Change Live	45,060	
15 June 2013	Rihanna	David Guetta, GTA	Diamonds World Tour	95,971	
16 June 2013	Rihanna	David Guetta, GTA	Diamonds World Tour	95,971	
8 July 2017	U2	Noel Gallagher's High Flying Birds	The Joshua Tree Tour 2017	108,894	
9 July 2017	U2	Noel Gallagher's High Flying Birds	The Joshua Tree Tour 2017	108,894	
19 June 2018	The Rolling Stones	James Bay	No Filter Tour	55,000	
14 July 2018	Eminem	2 Chainz, Royce 5'9" & Boogie	Revival Tour		
15 July 2018	Eminem	Prophets of Rage, Royce 5'9" & Boogie	Revival Tour		
20 June 2019	Metallica	Ghost; Bokassa	WorldWired Tour	51,819	
17 June 2023	Depeche Mode	Young Fathers	Memento Mori World Tour	53,981	
10 August 2024	Pastor Jerry Eze		NSPPD UK Prayer Conference	82,000	

=== American football ===
It was announced on 3 November 2015 that the RFU and America's National Football League had agreed a three-year deal to host at least three NFL London Games. The deal began in October 2016 and gave the opportunity to host an additional two games over the three-year period of the deal.

On 23 October 2016, the Los Angeles Rams hosted the New York Giants at Twickenham Stadium. This was the second of three London Games in 2016, with the others being played at Wembley. The game was televised live in the UK on BBC Two.

The final two games of the agreement were played in 2017, with matchups announced on 13 December 2016.

List of NFL London Games at Twickenham Stadium
Year	Date	UK Broadcaster	Designated Home	Score	Designated Away	Attendance
2016	23 October	BBC	(United States) Los Angeles Rams	10–17	(United States) New York Giants	74,121
2017	22 October	Sky Sports	(United States) Los Angeles Rams	33–0	(United States) Arizona Cardinals	73,736
2017	29 October	BBC	(United States) Cleveland Browns	16–33	(United States) Minnesota Vikings	74,237

=== Rugby league ===
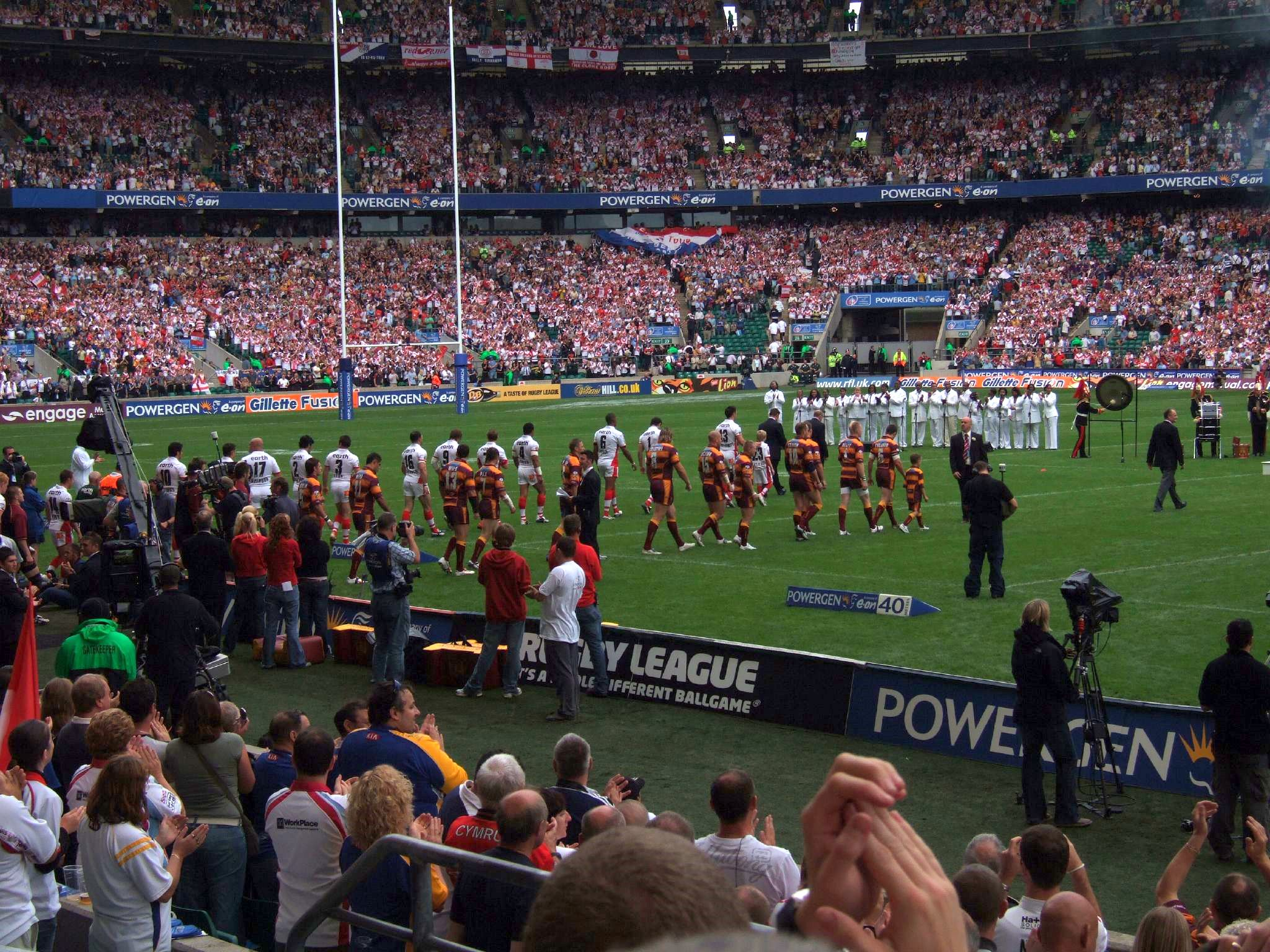
Teams walking out at Twickenham Stadium for the 2006 Challenge Cup Final

Twickenham Stadium was selected as a host venue for the 2000 Rugby League World Cup. The stadium hosted the opening match between co-hosts England and Ashes rivals Australia. The game, which was the first ever rugby league match at Twickenham, saw Australia claim a 22–2 victory.

During the reconstruction of Wembley Stadium, Twickenham was one of three venues which hosted the Challenge Cup Final in the years away from Wembley. The 2001 Challenge Cup Final saw St Helens beat Bradford Bulls 13–6. St Helens were victorious again in 2006 beating Huddersfield Giants 42–12.

=== Car rugby ===
The TV motoring show Top Gear used the pitch for an match of "car rugby". The game was 5-side and used smaller Kia Ceeds as backs and larger Kia Sportages as forwards. Jeremy Clarkson's team beat James May's team 17–14. This was played prior to the pitch being resurfaced.

== World Rugby Museum ==
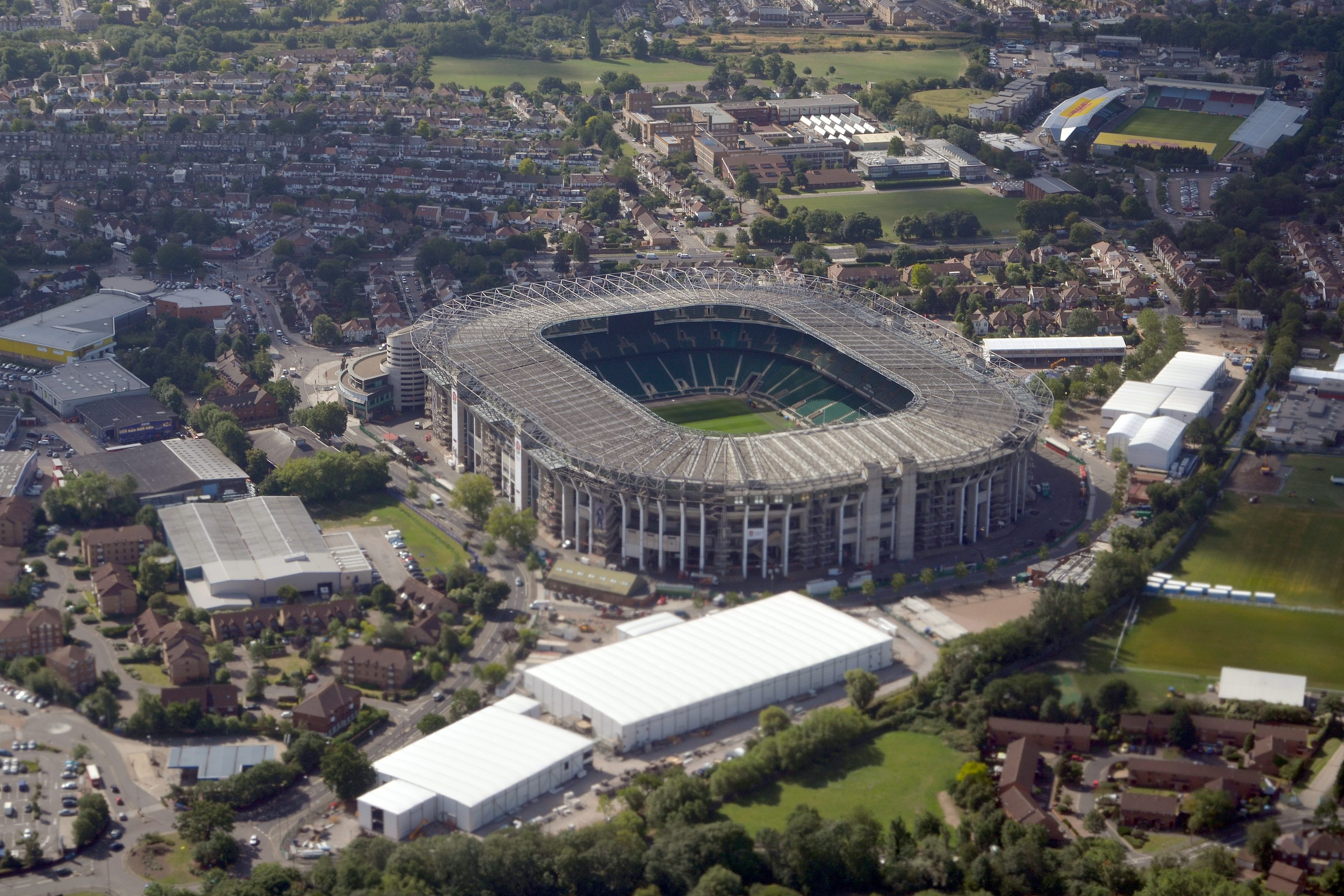
Twickenham Stadium (centre) and Stoop Stadium (top right) from the north in August 2015

The World Rugby Museum is a museum located in Twickenham Stadium. The museum covers the whole of the global game, not just English rugby union. It tells the history of the sport, including William Webb Ellis and Richard Lindon, using interactive display techniques. The museum has a rolling programme of special exhibitions which cover topical issues and offer an opportunity to display some of the obscurer items in the collection. Some unique displays include an English rugby union jersey from the first ever rugby union international in 1871 between England and Scotland, and (until 2005) the William Webb Ellis Cup which was obtained by England at the 2003 Rugby World Cup. Twickenham Stadium Tours are also available through the Museum and run four times per day (Tuesday to Saturday) and twice on Sundays. It is usually open every day of the week except for Mondays and on match days, when a special-priced entry is available for match ticket holders only.

== See also ==
- Twickenham Streaker (disambiguation)
- Sport in London
- Rugby union in England
- List of rugby union stadiums by capacity
- Lists of stadiums

Preceded by Eden Park; Auckland	Rugby World Cup final venue 1991	Succeeded by Ellis Park; Johannesburg
Preceded by Lansdowne Road; Dublin	Heineken Cup final venue 1999–2000	Succeeded by Parc des Princes; Paris
Preceded by Lansdowne Road; Dublin	Heineken Cup final venue 2003–04	Succeeded by Murrayfield; Edinburgh
Preceded by Millennium Stadium; Cardiff	Heineken Cup final venue 2006–07	Succeeded by Millennium Stadium; Cardiff
Preceded by Millennium Stadium; Cardiff	Heineken Cup final venue 2011–12	Succeeded by Aviva Stadium; Dublin
Preceded by Millennium Stadium; Cardiff	European Rugby Champions Cup final venue 2014–15	Succeeded by Parc Olympique Lyonnais; Lyon
Preceded by Eden Park; Auckland	Rugby World Cup final venue 2015	Succeeded by International Stadium Yokohama; Yokohama
