= Richard Bradshaw =

Richard Bradshaw may refer to:

- Richard Bradshaw (conductor) (1944–2007), British opera conductor and General Director of the Canadian Opera Company
- Richard Bradshaw (footballer), English footballer
- Richard Bradshaw (puppeteer) (born 1938), Australian puppeteer
- Richard Bradshaw, 17th century Ambassador of the Kingdom of England to Russia
- Richard Bradshaw (British Army officer) (1920–1999), Director General Army Medical Services, 1977–1981
