= Máire Bradshaw =

Poet and publisher

- Born: 1943 (age 82–83); Limerick
- Known for: Poet, publisher

Máire Bradshaw (born 1943) is a writer, poet and publisher. Bradshaw was born in Limerick, Ireland in 1943 and was educated in Laurel Hill convent before moving to Cork wherein she got involved with the feminist movement. She runs Bradshaw Books founded in 1985 as the Cork Women's Poetry Circle and has published Theo Dorgan and Dympna Dreyer amongst others. Bradshaw is a poet and was commissioned in 1991 to write the poem to celebrate the freedom of the city of Cork given to Mary Robinson, the first female president of Ireland as well as reading the presidential poem during her inauguration. Her work is also in a number of anthologies as well as collections of her own work. Bradshaw is also the director of Tig Fili, an organisation designed to provide workshops in art and poetry.

== Bibliography ==
- Wise Women: A Portrait (Bradshaw, 1994), ISBN 9780949010056
- High Time for All the Marys (Ink Sculptors, 1992), ISBN 9781871671254
