= Donald Bradshaw =

American politician and businessman

Donald Henry Bradshaw (May 11, 1932 – May 17, 2003) public figure and businessman, who served as mayor of Brisbane, California in the 1970s and 1980s as well as president of the Brisbane Chamber of Commerce
