= Kenrick Bradshaw =

Aruban footballer

Personal information
- Date of birth: April 19, 1970 (age 56)
- Position: Midfielder

International career
Years	Team	Apps	(Gls)
1996–2000	Aruba	4	(0)

Kenrick Bradshaw (born April 19, 1980) is an Aruban football player. He has played for the Aruba national team during the 1998 and 2002 FIFA World Cup qualifying rounds.
