= Muhammad Ali in China =

Muhammad Ali visits in China

Muhammad Ali visited China on three occasions. Ali's visits to China resulted in a revival of boxing in China, and influenced the development of the sport in China.

== First visit (1979) ==
Ali's first visit to China was in December, 1979. At this time, boxing was banned in China; the ban being imposed in 1959 after a death in the ring caused concerns about safety. During this visit, Ali met Deng Xiaoping, and informed Deng of his desire to revive boxing in China. "As long as people like it, we will develop it...Boxing can also be a bridge which enhances mutual understanding and friendship between Chinese and American people," was Deng's reply to Ali.

The visit was also important in the diplomatic sphere. Ali had gone to China as the first foreign athlete to visit the country at the invitation of the Chinese Olympic Committee and the China Sports Federation; he was also acting as an envoy of President Jimmy Carter in this visit with the mission of persuading China to participate in the 1984 Olympics. Pictures of Ali shaking hands with Deng gave a signal of China's willingness to engage with the world.

== Second visit (1985) ==
Ali's second visit to China was in 1985. In an interview he gave during this visit, Ali defended boxing's relative safety comparing it favorably with sports like car racing and skiing which he argued were more unsafe. This argument is believed to have resonated with the Chinese, and paved the way for a revival of boxing in China.

During this visit, Ali agreed to have boxing sessions with promising boxers. One of these fights was with a 20 year old light weight Wang Wei before 500 students at Peking Sports Institute. However, this was not a serious fight; Ali kept dancing away from his opponent, moved his right fist in exaggerated circles, and then pretended that he had been knocked out. Wang Wei described the fight as the "greatest day of his life."

A photograph of this visit, taken in a Shanghai gym, depicts a "rail-thin" boxer, Xiong Wei, reaching up to jab Ali; and Ali, in dark trousers and a white dress shirt, covering his face with his gloves. In a June 2016 interview, Xiong Wei's son Xiong Xin, a prominent Chinese boxer, said:

Back then, China was still isolated from the outside world and at a point where boxing was forbidden in the country - enthusiasts could only practise in secrecy. Muhammad Ali has not only given them guidance on technique, but also restored the hope and faith that inspired the boxers to be determined and committed [to the sport].

In an article published in China Youth News, Ali wrote: "Now that you are open to the world, never lose your culture, because others will try to give you their culture."

== Third visit (1993) ==
Ali's third visit to China was in 1993, and it was during this visit that an international boxing match was held in Beijing for the first time. Ali visited Shanghai during this visit and interacted with students.

== Influence ==
In 1987, China held its first national boxing championships, and the following month the China Boxing Association became an official member of the International Amateur Boxing Association, following which China started appearing on the boxing stage internationally. Ali has been credited for this development.

At Ali's death, Zou Shiming, wrote on Weibo that he had intended to meet Ali after winning a professional bout, "[b]ut now, I can only pray he is at peace in heaven, and free from illness and pain." In an interview, Zou mentioned that he was deeply grieved to hear the news of Ali's death, since Ali had been a source of great inspiration to him.

According to the BBC, Chinese media has highlighted Ali's refusal to be drafted, and his activism related to civil rights.
