= Keith Bradshaw =

Keith Bradshaw may refer to:

- Keith Bradshaw (cricketer) (1963–2021), Australian cricketer, accountant and administrator
- Keith Bradshaw (rugby union) (1939–2014), Wales international rugby union player
