= Mark Bradshaw =

Mark Bradshaw may refer to:

- Mark Bradshaw (composer) (born 1983), Australian film composer
- Mark Bradshaw (cricketer) (born 1973), Australian cricketer
- Mark Bradshaw (diver) (born 1962), American Olympic diver
- Mark Bradshaw (footballer) (born 1969), English former professional footballer and manager
- Mark Bradshaw (figure skater)
