= Bradshaw model =

Geographical model of river characteristics

The Bradshaw Model is an idealised geographical model which suggests how a river's characteristics vary between the upper course and lower course of a river. It indicates how discharge, occupied channel width, channel depth, and average load quantity increase downstream, and other properties such as load particle size, channel bed roughness, and gradient as characteristics that decrease. These features are represented by triangles; an increase in the size of a triangle represents an increase in the variable. Generally the Bradshaw model shows the characteristics expected to be present in a river, but due to the nature of rivers and the ever-changing environment in which they exist, not all rivers assimilate to the model. Therefore, the model is often applied to compare natural rivers against ideal rivers that can fit the model perfectly.
