= Thomas Bradshaw =

Thomas Bradshaw may refer to:

- Harry Bradshaw (footballer, born 1873) (1873–1899), also known as Thomas, association footballer of the 1890s for England, Northwich Victoria, Liverpool, Tottenham Hotspur and Thames Ironworks
- Tommy Bradshaw (1920–1981), rugby league footballer of the 1940s and 1950s for Great Britain, England, and Wigan
- Thomas Bradshaw (poet) (fl. 1591), English poet
- Thomas Bradshaw (postmaster) (1859–1934), Australian postmaster
- Thomas Bradshaw, victim of the Lynching of Thomas Bradshaw in 1927
- Thomas Bradshaw (playwright), American dramatist
- Thomas W. Bradshaw (born 1938), North Carolina politician
- Thomas Bradshaw (MP) (1733–1774), British civil servant and politician

== See also ==
- Tom Bradshaw (disambiguation)
