= Adrian Bradshaw (photographer) =

British photojournalist

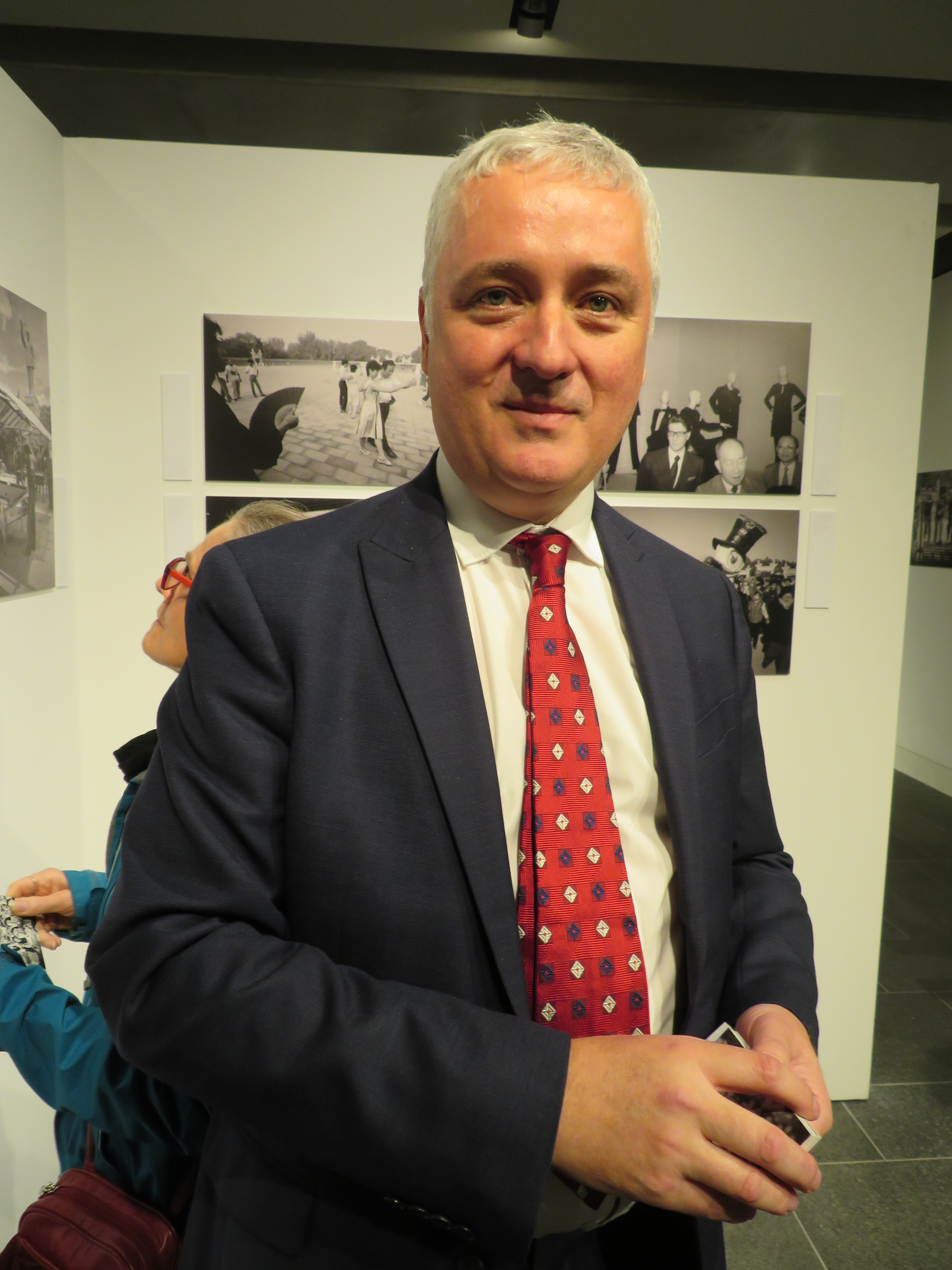
- Bradshaw at an exhibition of his photography in 2018
- Born: Adrian Peter Bradshaw; 10 July 1964 (age 62); Cambridge, United Kingdom
- Known for: Photography of China
- Website: apbphotoblog.wordpress.com

Adrian Peter Bradshaw (born 10 July 1964) is a British photojournalist who specializes in the photography of China.

== Biography ==
Bradshaw was born in Cambridge in 1964. In 1983 Bradshaw started to study for a BA in Chinese at SOAS University of London, and for the second year of the course he went to China to study at the Beijing Languages Institute from 1984 to 1985. He did not return to England immediately to finish his degree course, but took two years out in order to spend more time documenting life in China through the medium of photography. He returned to SOAS in Autumn 1987 to complete the last two years of his degree course, and so was absent from China during the 1989 Tiananmen Square protests. After completing his degree in Summer 1989, Bradshaw pursued a career as a photojournalist in China, where he lived and worked for most of the next twenty-five years, based in Beijing (1989–1997 and 2000–2014) and Shanghai (1997–2000). He mainly worked as a freelance photographer, but in 2003 he set up an office in Beijing for the European Pressphoto Agency. He returned to England with his wife and two children in 2014, and is now based in Oxford.

== Exhibitions ==
In order to celebrate the 40th anniversary of China's reform and opening up, an exhibition of Bradshaw's photography was put on at the 4th Shanghai Fashion Weekend held at the Shanghai Exhibition Center in October 2018.

An exhibition of his street photography taken in China during the 1980s was held by the Confucius Institute at Oxford Brookes University in October 2018. His photographs mostly captured everyday life of ordinary people in China, but also included photographs of Muhammad Ali's visit to China in 1985, and photographs of Deng Xiaoping, paramount leader of the People's Republic of China.

== Books ==
- The Door Opened: 1980s China. London: Impress, 2018. ISBN 978-1999782573.
