= John Bradshaw (criminal) =

17th century English criminal

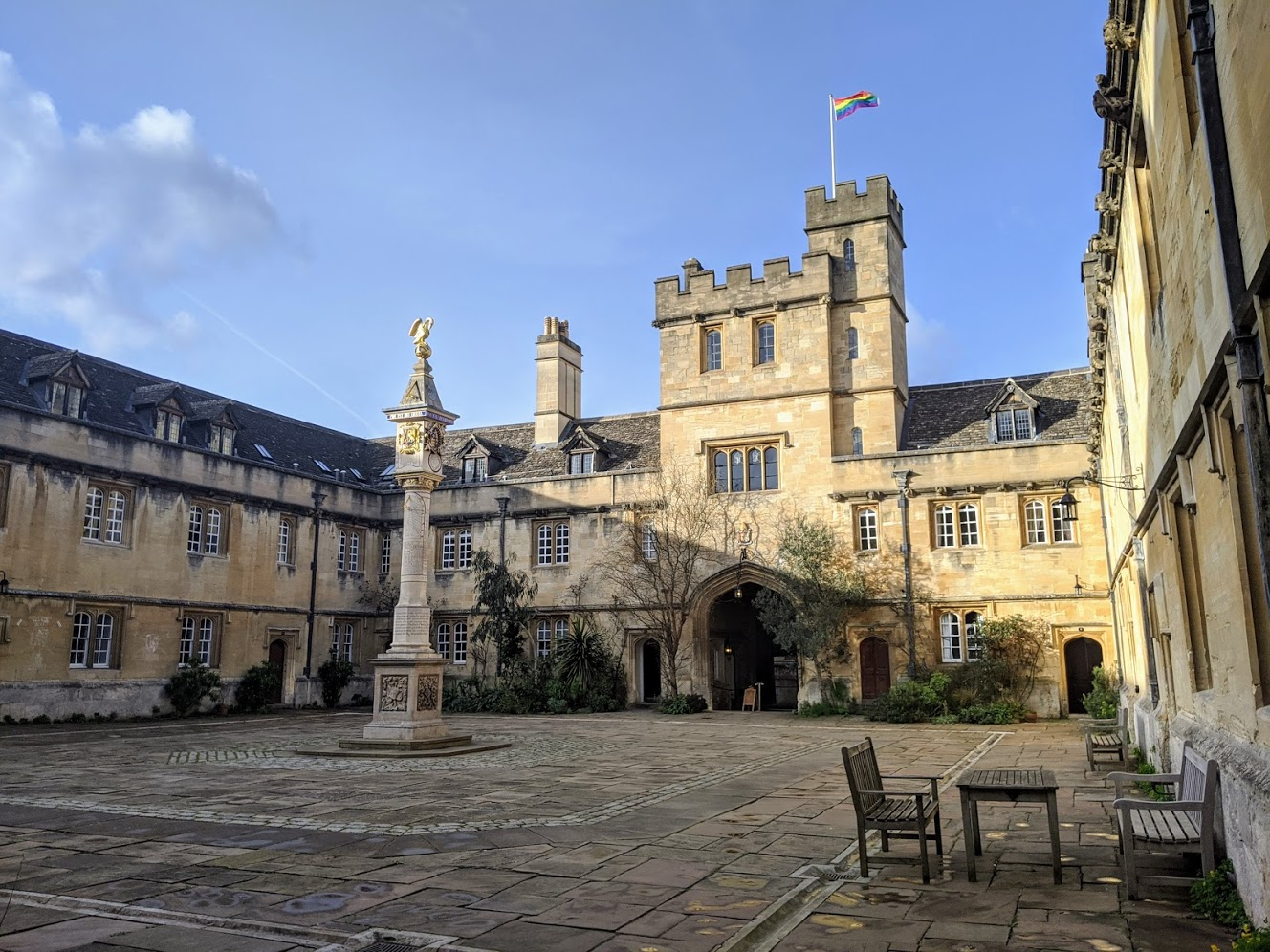
Corpus Christi College, Oxford, where Bradshaw attempted the robbery and murder of a senior fellow.

John Bradshaw (b. 1658/9) was an English criminal, convicted of the robbery and attempted murder of an Oxford fellow in 1677. The crime is known through the contemporary account of antiquarian and diarist Anthony Wood.

== Early life ==
Bradshaw was born in Maidstone, Kent, around 1658-9, to Alban Bradshaw, an attorney of Maidstone. He matriculated on 23 February 1674 from Corpus Christi College, Oxford, aged fifteen, and was admitted as a scholar on 20 April.

== Robbery and prosecution ==
In the early morning of 13 July 1677, two scholars of Corpus Christi, Bradshaw and Robert Newlin, broke into the chambers of John Wickes, a senior fellow at the college and (Wood notes with some disgust) Bradshaw's "patron and benefactor". They robbed Wickes's chambers, and then attempted to kill him by attacking him with a hammer while he slept. However the head fell off the hammer before it made contact, saving the fellow's life.

Both men were apprehended and locked up in the college for a night. That night Newlin managed to escape, Wood reports, by the "connivance" of Newlin's uncle, the President of Corpus Christi Robert Newlin. Bradshaw was not so lucky. Later taken prisoner at Oxford Castle, he was found guilty and sentenced to death on 27 July at an assizes held in Oxford.

Bradshaw petitioned the king for reprieve, and on the 31 July, through the influence of Arthur Annesley, 1st Earl of Anglesey, it was granted. Annesly went on however to petition Secretary of State for the Northern Department Joseph Williamson for Bradshaw's transportation. He argued that, while "not [...] fit to continue of a college after such an offence", such a "man being young and of great parts and learning" ought to be transported. This recommendation went on to receive the support of the vice-chancellor of Oxford, Dr Henry Clarke. However it is not known whether Bradshaw was transported, and Wood suggests otherwise.

== Later life ==
Bradshaw's later life is obscure. Wood, who recorded the circumstances of the initial robbery in his diary and went on to write about Bradshaw in his Athenae Oxonienses (1691-2), claimed that Bradshaw was pardoned entirely. He apparently later retired to Kent and taught at a petty school. Both Bradshaw and his associate Newlin were atheists in university, but Wood reports Bradshaw later became a Quaker, apparently taking up preaching, only to convert to Catholicism in 1685 on James II's ascension to the throne.

Wood attributes to Bradshaw the political pamphlet The Jesuite Countermin'd, or, An Account of a New Plot (London, 1679), signed "J. Br.", but modern biographer Stephen Wright considers it unlikely that Bradshaw would have authored "this ultra-loyalist work" and have "shortly become a Quaker, or a Roman Catholic".

Wright notes that neither Quaker nor Catholic denominations have any record of John Bradshaw, and fundamentally "his later career remains a matter for speculation". Neither Bradshaw's place or date of death are known.
