= Cherwell (newspaper) =

Oxford University student newspaper

- Front page of Cherwell on 8 October 2021
- Type: Weekly newspaper during Oxford University term time
- Format: Compact
- Owner: Oxford Student Publications Limited
- Founder(s): Cecil Binney and George Adolphus Edinger
- Editor: Oskar Doepke and Emma Heagney
- Founded: 1920; 106 years ago
- Language: English
- Headquarters: Salter’s Yard, Oxford, OX1 4LA
- Country: United Kingdom
- Circulation: c. 15,000
- ISSN: 0308-731X (print); 1742-3597 (web)
- Website: Cherwell.org

Cherwell (/ˈtʃɑːrwɛl/ CHAR-wel) is a student newspaper published entirely by students of Oxford University. Founded in 1920 and named after a local river, Cherwell is a subsidiary of independent student publishing house Oxford Student Publications Ltd. Receiving no university funding, the newspaper is one of the oldest and largest student publications in the UK. The paper is published five times each term.

== History ==
Cherwell was conceived by two Balliol College students, Cecil Binney and George Adolphus Edinger, on a ferry from Dover to Ostend during the summer vacation of 1920 while the students were travelling to Vienna to do relief work for the Save the Children charity. Edinger recalls the early newspaper having a radical voice: "We were feeling for a new Oxford …. We were anti-convention, anti-Pre War values, pro-feminist. We did not mind shocking and we often did." The publication was independent of the University of Oxford and it was entirely financed, staffed, and owned by students.

Early editions combine this seriousness with whimsy and parochialism. The first editorial gives the newspaper's purpose as being "to exclude all outside influence and interference from our University. Oxford for the Oxonians".

Cherwell was the only newspaper printed in Britain during the UK General Strike of 1926, other than the British Gazette and the British Worker, during which time it was produced at the offices of the Daily Mail in London.

Throughout the 1920s Cherwell had a strong literary focus, and a policy of not editing literary contributions. Undergraduate contributors included Evelyn Waugh, Graham Greene, John Betjeman, L. P. Hartley, Cecil Day-Lewis and W. H. Auden.

The newspaper's focus broadened over the coming decades until January 1953, when the owners of the paper decided to turn it into a university newspaper. In 1946 Cherwell was briefly banned by the university for distributing a survey on the sex lives of undergraduates, and in 1954 ran a series of pin-up photographs entitled "Girls of the Year". In 1970 then-editor Peter Stothard published a current Oxford theatre poster featuring a naked female, possibly a first for a British newspaper. Under his editorship Cherwell also published a backless photo of Gully Wells, considered very daring for the time. Both editions caused much comment. In 1973 the paper became a 'cause celebre' in the national papers when the Cherwell published a photo of general editor David Soskin with a topless model. This resulted in a personal fine by the proctors for David Soskin.

In 1964, the newspaper's longest-running feature was created, the "John Evelyn" gossip column, and it has run almost uninterrupted since then; its founding editors were Christopher Meakin and Michael Morris. Meakin then moved over to become editor of Isis the following term, in days when the parallel undergraduate magazine (although not then linked with Cherwell) also appeared weekly. Over the decades, many famous people have been the subject of "John Evelyn"'s wry and faux-condescending style, among them future Pakistani prime minister Benazir Bhutto, politician Jonathan Aitken, and actor Imogen Stubbs. In 1981, Hugh Grant is described as "New College's answer to Brooke Shields", and his unsuccessful attempts to infiltrate a ball with his date are reported. Cherwell's Editor in Michaelmas Term 1964 had been Patrick Marnham, who on leaving Oxford became a staff journalist on Private Eye, the British satirical magazine, and was author of the standard reference book on the history of the magazine which Marnham wrote as its 21st birthday celebration in 1982. The editor for the following Hilary Term 1965 was Michael Morris., His news editor on Cherwell, Sarah Boyd-Carpenter, is better known today as Baroness Hogg.

In the mid-1970s Cherwell survived one of its periodic financial crises, and politically the paper campaigned against Oxford University's investments in apartheid-era South Africa.

== Cherwell and the English language ==
The Oxford English Dictionary lists the terms 'sherry party' and 'Marxism' (as pertaining to the Marx Brothers) as having been coined in Cherwell. Additions from recent decades are lacking probably because Cherwell is only sporadically lodged at copyright libraries, and because it is not included in electronic text search systems such as LexisNexis. Xerox University Microfilms has micro-fiche copies of the paper for some years, especially the 1970s.

== Notable Cherwell contributors ==
- Harold Acton
- Jeffrey Archer, sports columnist, member of Parliament, novelist, House of Lords
- W. H. Auden
- John Betjeman
- H. S. Bhabra, arts editor; author and broadcaster
- Sarah Boyd-Carpenter, editor, journalist on The Economist; became Baroness Hogg
- Emma Brockes, editor; journalist on The Guardian
- John Brooke-Little, editor, founder of the Heraldry Society
- Nick Cohen, journalist
- Susan Cooper, editor; author of children's books, first woman to edit newspaper
- Alex Cox, cartoonist, film director
- Michael Crick, editor; BBC Newsnight and Channel 4 News reporter and biographer
- Howard Davies, writer; economist, CBI director-general; deputy governor Bank of England, director, London School of Economics
- Evan Davis, journalist BBC Radio 4 Today presenter
- Hadley Freeman, editor, journalist and author
- Graham Greene, playwright
- Sarah Hargreaves, editor; head of Editorial Standards and Training at BBC Television
- Simon Jenkins, Oxford Union correspondent; editor of The Times
- Christina Lamb, journalist
- Honcques Laus, activist, philosopher
- Peter Mandelson, journalist, political contributor; member of Parliament, peer
- Patrick Marnham, editor; chief reporter on and historian of Private Eye; journalist on Punch
- Peter Sissons, sports editor, 1963; BBC TV news presenter
- Owen Matthews, author, journalist
- Martin Sixsmith, editor, sports editor, news editor; former BBC Moscow correspondent
- Evelyn Waugh, journalist

== Cherwell.org ==
Cherwell has had a website since Trinity 1996, with the current website developed by Nelson Fernandes Serrao, former Oxford Student Publications Limited chair, in 2022.

The site is updated every day during term and regularly during the vacation. It contains all of the articles from the print edition, as well as breaking news, videos, features, arts reviews, sport reports and podcasts such as the soap opera podcast Staircase 22. Students use the website to vote on the paper's regular feature, Fit College and also to post comments on articles.

In 2008, Cherwell won the 'Guardian Student Media' award for Best Student Website.

Cherwell was awarded Best Publication in the South East region in the 2022 Student Publication Association Awards. Two news pieces were also shortlisted for the National Awards. It won the Best Publication award for the South East region again in 2024 at the Student Publication Association awards, and was shortlisted for the national award. The publication and its staff were shortlisted for eleven SPA national awards in total. In 2025, the paper won the award for Best Website and was 'highly commended' for Best Overall Digital Media at the SPA National Conference. Four Cherwell journalists also received individual awards.

During the same year, it conducted interviews with all leading candidates for the first election of the Chancellor of the University of Oxford, including Peter Mandelson, William Hague, Elish Angiolini, and Dominic Grieve.

In 2025, Cherwell became the first student newspaper in the UK to become a member of the Independent Press Standards Organisation (IPSO).

== Sources ==
- Cherwell 75 Years, anniversary edition of Cherwell, November 1995
- A Short History of the Cherwell
