= Paul Bradshaw =

Paul Bradshaw may refer to:

- Paul Bradshaw (footballer, born 1953) (1953–2026), English professional football midfielder
- Paul Bradshaw (footballer, born 1956) (1956–2024), English professional football goalkeeper
- Paul Bradshaw (journalist), British online journalist, blogger, and journalism academic
- Paul Bradshaw (television), British television writer director and producer
- Paul Bradshaw (cricketer) (born 1978), English cricketer
- Paul F. Bradshaw (born 1945), British professor of liturgy at the University of Notre Dame
- Paul Bradshaw, founder and editor of British music magazine publication Straight No Chaser
