= David Bradshaw =

American artist (born 1944)

- Born: September 28, 1944 (age 82); New York City, New York, US
- Education: Hartford Art School
- Occupation: Artist
- Known for: Sculpture, Printmaking, Painting, Performance Art
- Movement: Postminimalism
- Patrons: Robert Rauschenberg

David Bradshaw (born September 28, 1944) is an American artist based in Cecilia, Louisiana, and East Charleston, Vermont. He is a painter, sculpture, and printmaker.

== Biography ==
Born in New York City, David Bradshaw was raised in Washington, D.C., and Old Greenwich, Connecticut. His father was a modern interior designer, and his mother a classical pianist.

He pursued a BA at the Hartford Art School from 1962 to 1965. With less than one year remaining to obtain his degree, he left school and traveled throughout Europe spending his time sketching the regional landscapes and its inhabitants. Upon his return to the US, Bradshaw became extremely active in the US Civil Rights Movement.

In 1976, he was alleged to have shot and killed Cheeseface, the dog who appeared on National Lampoon's famous "If You Don't Buy This Magazine, We'll Kill This Dog" cover.

== Artistic work ==
Trained in traditional artistic skills and processes, Bradshaw is known for his use of handguns, explosive devices (typically dynamite) and steel to create large-scale, free standing sculptures; reshaping the metal through the force of controlled explosions. He carves intricate patterns and designs into sheets of steel using a plasma torch.

== Collaborations ==
Over the last 40 years, Bradshaw has shown and collaborated with contemporary artists such as Robert Rauschenberg, Richard Serra, Keith Sonnier, Philip Taaffe, Eva Hesse, Bruce Nauman, Tina Girouard, Laurie Anderson and James Surls, among many others. During the 1960s he participated in various performance art pieces with Deborah Hay, Steve Paxton, Trisha Brown, Lamont Young, and Yvonne Rainer, Bradshaw played an integral part in the development of the exhibition space, 112 Greene Street in NYC. This space became a key exhibition and performance space for emerging artists and helped SoHo to emerge as a center for the arts scene in New York City. He exhibited his work there early in his career alongside the artist, and close friend, Gordon Matta-Clark.

In 1969, Bradshaw was one of seven artists commissioned by gallerist and art publisher Rosa Esman to participate in a project entitled 7 Objects/69, a limited-edition artwork of multiples by seven process artists. The seven minimal and conceptual objects in 7 Objects/69 included sculpture by Eva Hesse, Richard Serra, Alan Saret, Keith Sonnier, and Steven Kaltenbach; a record album by Bruce Nauman; and Bradshaw's painting, Tears.

In his mid-twenties, Bradshaw was invited to create art at Untitled Press at Rauschenberg's residence and studio on Captiva Island. He spent a number of months here creating new work in the late 1960s. In 1973, this work was subsequently included in an exhibit beside works by Rauschenberg, Cy Twombly, Brice Marden, and Robert Whitman at the Wadsworth Atheneum. His early works included photography, films, drawing, printmaking and large-scale minimalist paintings.

== Explosion sculpture ==
In 1970, after a visit to his studio by gallerists Leo Castelli and Ileana Sonnabend (at the urging of his collaborator Robert Rauschenberg) he was offered a solo show by Sonnabend to open her latest gallery. When Bradshaw told Sonnabend that he had shifted his focus from painting to explosion performance and chose not to paint the 12 paintings she asked for, Sonnabend expressed her opinion that explosion art was not something that could be sold. This changed the course of Bradshaw's art career, but having grown up with a passion for guns and a natural talent for marksmanship it was only a matter of time before his art evolved from painting on canvas into explosion performance and shot steel.

During the 1970s, Bradshaw further explored the integration of his passion for shooting with his passion for creating art. He worked extensively with large sheets of treadplate steel and dynamite to create both free standing and wall mounted sculpture. He experimented at times with blasting rock. Shooting became a more integral part of his medium. In 1972, Steve Paxton, a choreographer, pounding the keys of an upright piano until they no longer made any sound. He and Bradshaw subsequently dragged the piano into a field at which time, he shot it once and declared it dead. This would be the precursor to his "fulmination" sculpture (as described by art critic and writer Jill Johnston), Piano, which he created in July 2005 over two days with the help of 2000 rounds of ammunition, sixty friends and family members.

In 1986, Bradshaw and Robert Rauschenberg, the artist, held an exhibition of their works on paper at the Catamount Arts Center in St. Johnsbury, Vermont. Rauschenberg exhibited prints from his Chow Bag series while Bradshaw exhibited drawings and other works on paper from his South America Pond series.

Bradshaw collaborated extensively with William S. Burroughs, his friend another artist and writer, over a number of years until Burroughs’ death in 1997. Bradshaw's art had a significant influence on the direction of Burrough's own artistic creativity and development. The two created steel sculptures, paintings, and prints together which in most instances were then shot by the two marksman artists. As one of the pall bearers at Burroughs' funeral, Bradshaw placed Burroughs' favorite pistol in his hand prior to burial. Their collaboration resulted most notably in a Graphicstudio portfolio of prints titled Propagation Hazard, along with a series of cut-out steel silhouettes and target paintings on canvas which were then shot and signed by both artists.

== Exhibition history and collections ==
Bradshaw’s work has been exhibited in museums and galleries throughout the United States and Europe. His work was included in Ports of Entry, a retrospective of art and written works by Burroughs at the Los Angeles County Museum of Art in 1996. Over the years he has had various exhibitions at Jonathan Ferrara Gallery in New Orleans, Louisiana, and most recently at Kolok Gallery in North Adams, MA and from December 12, 2009, through January 23, 2010, at the Andrea Rosen Gallery in New York City. His work has been critically reviewed in Art in America (Dec. 2005 and 1998), Contact Quarterly, and ArtForum as well as in other periodicals and newspapers throughout the United States.

His artwork has been collected both privately and publicly throughout the U.S. and Europe. Notable collections include the estates of artist Robert Rauschenberg and writer/artist William S. Burroughs, the National Gallery of Art, Smithsonian Institution, Walker Art Center, Whitney Museum of American Art, Los Angeles County Museum of Art, Stedelijk Museum, Mildred Lane Kemper Art Museum, Polk Museum of Art, the University of S. Florida Contemporary Art Museum, Smith College Museum of Art, and the Sheldon Swope Art Museum.

Over a dozen of Bradshaw's large-scale plasma torch sculptures are in the private collection of the House of Blues and are on permanent exhibit at their performance venues in Las Vegas, Nevada; Anaheim, California; and Orlando, Florida.

== Reference material ==
Prints from the Untitled Press, Captiva, Florida Wadsworth Atheneum; 72 pages, 1973.

Rauschenberg by Mary Lynn Kotz; 320 pages, 1990.

Ports of Entry: William S. Burroughs and the Arts <https://www.amazon.com/Ports-Entry-William-Burroughs-Arts/dp/0500974357/ref=sr_1_1?ie=UTF8&s=books&qid=1245152428&sr=1-1> by Robert A. Sobieszek and William S. Burroughs 192 pages, (Paperback - Oct 1996).

Taken by Surprise: A Dance Improvisation Reader by Ann Cooper Albright and David Gere, 304 pages, 2003.

The Judson Dance Theater: Performative Traces by Ramsay Burt, 204 pages, 2007.

The Artists Bluebook, Edited by Lonnie Pierson Dunbier, 2005.
