= Ernest Bradshaw =

English footballer

Personal information
- Date of birth: 1887
- Place of birth: Padiham, England
- Position: Wing half

Senior career*
Years	Team	Apps	(Gls)
19xx–1909	Accrington Stanley	?	(?)
1909	Blackburn Rovers	0	(0)
1909–19xx	Nelson	?	(?)
19xx–1911	Padiham	?	(?)
1911–1914	Burnley	8	(0)
1914–19xx	Padiham	?	(?)
- * Club domestic league appearances and goals

Ernest Bradshaw (1887 – after 1914) was an English professional footballer who played as a wing half.

== Football career ==
Born in Padiham, he played his entire career with Lancashire clubs. Bradshaw played for Accrington Stanley before joining Football League First Division side Blackburn Rovers in 1909. However, he did not make a senior appearance for the club and returned to non-League football with Nelson. After a spell with hometown club Padiham, Bradshaw was signed by nearby First Division outfit Burnley in June 1911.

Bradshaw was unable to properly break into the first team at Turf Moor and made only one league appearance in the 1911–12 season, covering for left-winger Jack Harris in the 1–0 win against Nottingham Forest on 10 February 1912. He started the first game of the following campaign, but despite the team beating Glossop 2–1 he was dropped for the next match along with Tommy Boyle, Jack Picken and Eddie Mosscrop. After almost seven months in the reserves, Bradshaw returned to the starting line-up for five of the last six fixtures of the season. He remained with Burnley for another year but played just one more senior match, deputising for Billy Watson in the 3–1 defeat at Newcastle United.

After being released by Burnley in the summer of 1914 Bradshaw had a second spell Padiham, although he did return to Turf Moor to play twice for the Clarets as a guest player during the First World War.
