= Michael J. Bradshaw =

British geographer

Michael Joseph Bradshaw is a British geographer. He is a former vice president of the Royal Geographical Society and professor of global energy at Warwick Business School.

== Biography ==
BSc from the University of Birmingham, his MA from the University of Calgary and his PhD at the University of British Columbia. His background is in human geography. Until January 2014, Bradshaw served as professor of human geography at the University of Leicester. Bradshaw serves as professor of global energy at Warwick Business School. He is a Fellow of the Royal Geographical Society and Academician of the Academy of Social Sciences. He was formerly vice president of the Royal Geographical Society. Bradshaw specializes in the geopolitical economy of global energy, on which he was written and taught widely.

== Selected bibliography ==
- Global energy dilemmas : energy security, globalization, and climate change, 2014
- Global energy : issues, potentials, and policy implications, 2015
- An introduction to human geography : 5th edition, 2016
