= Duncan Bradshaw =

English cricketer

Personal information
- Full name: Duncan Phillip Bradshaw
- Born: 19 February 1986 (age 40); Harare, Zimbabwe
- Batting: Right-handed
- Bowling: Right-arm fast-medium

Domestic team information
- Years: Team
- 2008: Marylebone Cricket Club
- 2006–2010: Oxford UCCE/MCCU

Career statistics
Competition	First-class	List A
Matches	12	1
Runs scored	529	12
Batting average	37.78	12.00
100s/50s	1/2	–/–
Top score	127*	12
Balls bowled	675	–
Wickets	6	–
Bowling average	67.83	–
5 wickets in innings	–	–
10 wickets in match	–	–
Best bowling	2/41	–
Catches/stumpings	2/–	–/–
- Source: Cricinfo, 24 November 2011

Duncan Phillip Bradshaw (born 19 February 1986) is an English cricketer. Bradshaw is a right-handed batsman who bowls right-arm fast-medium. He was born in the Zimbabwean capital of Harare into a White Zimbabwean family of British descent and educated at Hilton College in South Africa, before moving with his family to England.

== Biography ==
While studying for his degree at Oxford Brookes University Business School, Bradshaw made his debut in first-class cricket for Oxford UCCE against Derbyshire in 2006. He played for Oxford UCCE in 2006, 2007 and 2008. Following the teams renaming to Oxford MCCU, he continued to play for team in 2009 and 2010, making a total of twelve first-class appearances. In his twelve first-class appearances, he scored 529 runs at an average of 37.78, with a high score of 127 not out. This score, which was his only first-class century, came against Nottinghamshire in 2008. In addition to his lone century, he also made two half centuries.

In the 2008 season, he was part of the first internship programme run by the MCC, which placed promising university players with first-class counties, with Bradshaw undertaking his internship with Essex, though was unable to force his way into the Essex first XI. In that same season he played a single List A match for the Marylebone Cricket Club against Bangladesh A at The Racecourse, Durham. He scored 12 runs in the Marylebone Cricket Club's innings, before being dismissed by Rubel Hossain. Bangladesh A won the match by 80 runs. He has also played Second XI cricket for a number of first-class counties besides Essex, though has been unable to secure a contract with any.
