= Darren Bradshaw =

Darren Bradshaw may refer to:

- Darren Bradshaw (Australian footballer) (born 1980), Australian rules footballer
- Darren Bradshaw (English footballer) (born 1967), English footballer
