= Steve Bradshaw =

American soccer player

Personal information
- Position: Midfielder

Senior career*
Years	Team	Apps	(Gls)
1980	Memphis Rogues	1	(0)
1980–1981	Calgary Boomers (indoor)	5	(0)
1982–1983	Memphis Americans (indoor)	9	(0)
- * Club domestic league appearances and goals

Steve Bradshaw is an American retired soccer midfielder who played professionally in the Major Indoor Soccer League and the North American Soccer League.

In 1980, the Memphis Rogues drafted Bradshaw out of Wooddale High School. At the end of the season the team moved to Calgary, Canada to become the Calgary Boomers. Bradshaw played during the 1980-1981 indoor NASL season with the Boomers, but saw no game time during the 1981 outdoor season. In 1982, he returned to Memphis to join the Memphis Americans of the Major Indoor Soccer League draft.
