= Charlie Bradshaw =

Charlie Bradshaw may refer to:

- Charlie Bradshaw (offensive tackle) (1936–2002), American football offensive tackle
- Charlie Bradshaw (American football coach) (1923–1999), American football coach at the University of Kentucky and Troy University
- Charles Bradshaw (born 1805), Victorian merchant and politician
