= Harry Bradshaw (footballer, born 1896) =

English footballer

Personal information
- Full name: Harold Bruce Bradshaw
- Date of birth: 8 August 1896
- Place of birth: Leicester, England
- Date of death: October 1967 (aged 71)
- Position: Winger

Senior career*
Years	Team	Apps	(Gls)
1919–1920	West Ham United	14	(0)
Total		14	(0)
- * Club domestic league appearances and goals

Harold Bruce Bradshaw (8 August 1896 – October 1967) was an English footballer who played in the Football League for West Ham United.
