= Philippe Bradshaw =

British artist

Philippe Bradshaw was a British artist. Born in 1965 in Uppingham in Rutland, he grew up in Stamford, Lincolnshire, and attended Stamford School.

Bradshaw graduated from Goldsmiths College in 1988 alongside several of the artists who were to participate in the YBA scene of art.

Bradshaw made many works using chainlink tapestries, made link by link, within whole room installations. Bradshaw lived his work and was considered eccentric even amongst his peers. Bradshaw was awarded a Hamlyn Award in 2000. In 2001, Bradshaw featured in a BBC documentary The New East Enders alongside Tim Noble and Sue Webster.

Between 1993 and 1999, Bradshaw collaborated with Andrea Mason making work as 'Andrea + Philippe'.

He died on 25 August 2005 in Paris, France.

== Publications ==
- Philippe Bradshaw: A Fly in the House, Pub. Hatje Kantz, 2005.
- Norman Rosenthal, Max Wigram, Sex and the British, Éd. Thaddaeus Ropac, Paris, 2000
- Philippe Bradshaw, Éd. Thaddaeus Ropac, Paris, 2001.
