= Bill Bradshaw (rugby league) =

English rugby league footballer

Personal information
- Full name: William Bradshaw
- Born: unknown
- Died: 2017

Playing information
- Position: Hooker
Club
Years	Team	Pld	T	G	FG	P
1943–45	Featherstone Rovers	20	0	0	0	0
1946	Bramley RLFC
1947	Bradford Northern
1948	Hull KR
1950–57	Featherstone Rovers	50	0	0	0	0
1957–58	Doncaster RLFC
	Total	70	0	0	0	0
- Relatives: Harry Bradshaw (brother)

Bill Bradshaw (birth unknown – 2017) was a professional rugby league footballer who played in the 1940s and 1950s. He played at club level for Featherstone Rovers, as a hooker.

== Club career ==
=== Challenge Cup Final appearances ===
Bill Bradshaw played hooker in Featherstone Rovers' 12-18 defeat by Workington Town in the 1951–52 Challenge Cup Final during the 1951–52 season at Wembley Stadium, London on Saturday 19 April 1952, in front of a crowd of 72,093.

=== Club career ===
Bill Bradshaw made his début for Featherstone Rovers on Saturday 18 December 1943, and he played his last match for Featherstone Rovers during 1956–57 season.
