= The Bradshaws =

Fictional family created and voiced by Buzz Hawkins for radio and television

- Genre: Comedy
- Country of origin: United Kingdom
- Language: English
- Starring: Buzz Hawkins
- Created by: Buzz Hawkins

The Bradshaws is a fictional family created and voiced by the comedian and musician Buzz Hawkins. The family was created for The Gary Davies Show with Gary Davies on Piccadilly Radio in 1983 when Hawkins wrote a poem about a family's day trip to Blackpool. This soon developed into a series. In 1986, Hawkins was made producer of The Phil Wood Show, on which he performed more Bradshaws material.

Hawkins would go on to sell cassettes of his Bradshaws episodes, which he still does to this day, as well as doing stand-up, acting and more. The Bradshaws series has been re-released as a 25 volume C.D. collection. The series has gained great popularity in the North and abroad. It has been said that some people still ask who the voice actors are even though all the characters are voiced by Hawkins.

== Broadcast ==
Some episodes were also made into a television series by Granada TV. The series can be heard as a strand of the Billy Butler show on BBC Radio Merseyside, on the Chorley-based Station Chorley FM, and on 7 Waves Radio 92.1. The show is now also played on 94.4FM Salford City Radio, Tameside Radio 103.6 FM, Cheshire's Canalside Radio 102.8fm, Crewe and Nantwich based station The Cat 107.9 FM and Wythenshawe FM 97.2 after a fan petition on change.org achieved the required 9 signatures to get the show back on air. 'The Bradshaws' is broadcast every weekday morning as part of Andy Lloyd's Morning Show which forms part of The ILR Network and is syndicated live to many UK and international radio stations.

== Setting ==
The Bradshaws is set in a Cosy Terraced House with outside loo in the fictional Manchester suburb of Barnoldswick (any relation to the actual town of Barnoldswick, is apparent only in the name as the characters refer to Manchester as being their local town on many occasions) in the era of pounds, shillings and pence (probably sometime in the 1960s), there is almost always a brass band playing two or three streets away (Hawkins thought that some quiet brass band music in the background would help make the series feel warm and cosy). The Bradshaws are a normal working-class family with little money, although they are able to afford a few luxuries (such as Alf's Woodbines). Plus, Audrey and Alf's faces are never seen in the TV series (though Audrey's is briefly seen in 'Puddled').

== Main characters ==
=== Audrey ===
Audrey is the stereotypical housewife. She likes entering competitions and winning holidays to Venus and Torimonalisus (she mispronounced Venice and Torremolinos). Audrey is considerably less intelligent than Alf and often shows this through complete lack of common knowledge. For example, she seems to think that the coalman and Michael Morris's Mam are just 'friends', even though the other characters find it obvious that they are having an affair (see Minor Characters). Audrey (seemingly) cooks very badly. When she made steak and kidney pudding for Billy and Alf's tea she left it boiling dry resulting in burnt pastry (which tasted like cardboard according to Alf).

Audrey has a sister called Pamela, whom Alf hates. She always has a best trifle dish and wears an apron.

=== Alf ===
Alf is the family patriarch and a 'male shoulderless pig' (according to Audrey), he eats corned dog (which he calls it whereas Audrey refers to it by its actual name). The only times when he is obviously nice to Billy are when he is drunk; he smokes and gets Billy to fetch him either a box of matches (Swan Vesta), corned beef, or much more. His face is never seen, and he appears to be quite a huge man who has very little money, he sarcastically calls Audrey mock-affectionate names such as "sweet little thistle" and hated Poshy/Oswald (see below for more detail).

=== Billy ===
William "Billy" Bradshaw is perhaps the most popular character in the series. He loves both his parents (though Alf can be very mean to him on occasions), Billy, like Michael, is a puppet who acts as a son to two adults, Billy enjoys going to the flicks and would like a pet of some sort, either a dog, zebra or "Zedgie" (an imaginary animal that Alf made up). Billy is Michael's best friend. Michael is allowed bubble gum, which makes Billy jealous and envious, Billy often tries to get some bubble gum; however, his parents refuse to give him some.

=== Poshy/Oswald ===
Poshy or Oswald was Billy's kitten, Audrey and Billy both originally referred to him as a he at first, but after Audrey took the cat down to a woman's house. It was then realised Poshy/Oswald was now a girl; she only appears in three episodes. In the episode 'Open Wide', Poshy escaped from the Bradshaws home and ran to (possibly) Winefred Dutton's and never appeared again, Billy and Audrey were both worried. Alf in a selfish way, was pleased that Poshy had run away. In the TV version of Postman's Knock, Poshy did make a cameo appearance at the end where while Alf was making a depressed Audrey a brew, he saw through the window Oswald with a scruffy tom cat, sitting on the wall. He then jokingly said Hey up! Oswald's found his dad.

=== The Dog ===
The Dog is nameless, it is not a major character in the series but is still used in the house. The dog appears to be a brindle Bull Terrier, the dog usually wears Alf's hats, seeing that he puts them on it; it turns its head to see what goes in the house and appears to "threaten" Poshy, the kitten.

== Minor characters ==
The minor characters are never heard to speak (although Michael occasionally announces his presence with his mouth organ).

=== Michael Morris ===
Michael Morris is Billy Bradshaw's best friend, he wears a pair of Clinic Glasses for his lazy eye(or as Alf calls it 'friendly eyes' because they keep looking at each other). Michael is based on a school friend of Buzz Hawkins (who was also called Michael Morris).

=== Betty Morris ===
Betty Morris is the mother of Michael Morris. She is having an affair with the coal man (although Audrey refuses to believe this). Betty and Audrey often love to go out for a game of housey housey (bingo).

=== Mr Morris ===
Mr Morris is the Father of Michael Morris (although Michael's real father is the Coalman), Mr Morris is tight-fisted and bald, he has stolen Alf's tools several times.

=== Uncle Wally One-Ball ===
Uncle Walter is Audrey's Uncle, he got a Gunshot to a 'sensitive' area in The Great War and now drags his leg, he used to go by the stage name Bert Scroginbottom he played the banjolele and wrote his own songs. He was destined for stardom but he accidentally left his kitbag in the NAAFI with all his songs inside and it was stolen by a buck-toothed private named Formby.

=== Pamela ===
Auntie Pamela is Audrey's sister. She is constantly knitting tank tops for Billy and Alf although they never fit properly. As a matter of fact, Alf wears one that she knitted for Billy. Pamela also makes knitted swimming trunks for Billy. Although Pamela and Alf are often trying new ways to annoy each other, there is a rumour that they like each other. In one episode she keeps calling Alf Alfred.

=== God ===
God features in many episodes. According to Alf (who should not be believed as he is an agnostic) the moon is a hole in the sky for God to spy on people and the sun is his reading light. He turns it on for filling in his diary. God seems to show a strong dislike for Alf, as shown by the numerous times that bad things happen to him. This may be because Alf kept some rude magazines that Audrey told Alf to bin.

=== Whinifred ===
Whinifred is Billy's crush. In love letters he is whinging because he didn't get a letter from her and he refuses to give Alf the one he wrote to her.

=== Kevin ===
Kevin is a boy that moves near the Bradshaws house, he kicked Alf in the shin because he kept winding him up
