= 2018 Oxford City Council election =

2018 UK local government election

- 3 May 2018

24 of 48 seats to Oxford City Council 25 seats needed for a majority
	First party	Second party	Third party
Party	Labour	Liberal Democrats	Green
Last election	18 seats, 47.0%	4 seats, 18.1%	1 seat, 16.9% (Note: Results for the "last election" shown in this table are for the 2016 Oxford City Council election.)
Seats before	34 (16 up)	8 (4 up)	4 (3 up)
Seats won	18	5	1
Seats after	36	9	2
Seat change	▲1	▲1	▼2
Popular vote	18,227	8,892	5,535
Percentage	47.8%	23.3%	14.5%
Swing	▲0.8%	▲5.1%	▼2.5%
- Results of the 2018 Oxford City Council election
Leader of the Council before election
Susan Brown
Labour
Elected Leader of the Council
Susan Brown
Labour

The 2018 Oxford City Council election took place on 3 May 2018, to elect 24 of the 48 members of Oxford City Council in England. This was on the same day as other local elections in England. Each of Oxford's 24 wards elected one councillor, with the other seat in each ward next due for election in May 2020.

The Labour Party sought to defend its majority on the council, which it had controlled since 2008. Key issues in the election campaign included affordable housing, homelessness and air pollution. The results saw Labour gain two seats from the Green Party while losing one to the Liberal Democrats. This left Labour with 36 seats, the Liberal Democrats with 9 and the Greens with 2.

== Background ==
Before the election, the Labour Party held a majority of seats on Oxford City Council. When the 24 seats up for election in 2018 were contested at the 2014 Oxford City Council election, 17 were won by Labour, 4 by the Liberal Democrats, and 3 by the Green Party of England and Wales. The 2016 election, at which the council's other 24 seats were contested, saw a stronger result for Labour (18 seats won) and weaker for the Greens (1 seat).

The 2018 election was the first regular election to Oxford City Council since the 2016 United Kingdom European Union membership referendum, at which Oxford defied a UK-wide vote to leave the European Union by returning a 70% vote to remain. A year after the referendum, in the 2017 UK general election, Labour significantly increased its majority in the parliamentary constituency of Oxford East (which includes most of the city of Oxford), while the Liberal Democrats gained Oxford West and Abingdon from the Conservative Party.

New Statesman commentator Stephen Bush suggested in March 2018 that a successful result for Labour in the 2018 Oxford City Council election, building on its strong parliamentary performance in 2017, would be to win all the available Green seats. The Oxford Mail's political correspondent Nathan Briant predicted, "Labour are likely to return a healthy number of councillors", but identified potential difficulties for the party: a rise in homelessness in Oxford as in other cities, controversy of the council's use of community protection notices to threaten to fine homeless people, and a perception of the national Labour leadership as too eurosceptic.

Stephen Bush argued that if the Liberal Democrats' national strategy of appealing to pro-European voters succeeded, one benchmark for this would be an expansion from eight seats on Oxford City Council to double figures.

== Policies and campaigns ==
=== Conservative ===
The Oxford Conservative Association's chair Mark Bhagwandin criticised the Labour administration for a lack of affordable housing in Oxford, including at the recent Barton development. He stated he was confident that the Conservatives could improve on their previously weak position in Oxford, and that they would hold Labour to account. The party pledged to freeze the salaries of senior council staff, which Bhagwandin described as "huge".

=== Green ===
The Green Party's campaign also emphasised a need for scrutiny and opposition; co-leader Caroline Lucas stated while campaigning in Oxford that "one more Labour councillor won't make any difference", while "one more Green councillor" would ensure the council was "forced to deliver". Lucas identified homelessness as the issue on which Oxford's Green councillors been most active, and the Greens' manifesto highlighted their past campaigns for the council to provide additional homeless shelters and consider the use of rent controls, as well as their role in challenging fines for rough sleepers and removal of their property. Green policies also included addressing air pollution in St. Clement's by extending the council's proposed zero-emission zone, and redesignating the entire development on the Lucy Faithfull House site for affordable housing (instead of half as proposed by the council).

=== Labour ===
Oxford's governing Labour Party pledged in its manifesto, subtitled Fighting Austerity for a Fairer City, to build 1000 affordable homes and work with adjacent councils on "high quality urban extensions that will increase the availability of affordable homes". The Leader of the council, Susan Brown, advocated more development in the Oxford Green Belt to meet the city's housing needs. Emphasising Oxford's "strong cycling tradition", the manifesto included policies to provide more lanes and parking for cyclists, while supporting cycle hire businesses. On homelessness, Labour pledged increased spending and cooperation with charitable and voluntary organisations "with the objective of ensuring that no-one has to sleep rough in Oxford". Other "key pledges" included promotion of an Oxford living wage, support for sports clubs and facilities, and measures to reduce the city's carbon footprint and air pollution.

Launching the manifesto, Susan Brown and Shadow Secretary of State for Housing John Healey attacked the central government's austerity programme as responsible for homelessness and other social problems in Oxford and elsewhere, while Healey praised Oxford City Council's track record under its Labour administration. The Guardian journalist and Labour activist Owen Jones canvassed for the party's candidate Rabyah Khan in Summertown.

=== Liberal Democrat ===
Liberal Democrat leader Vince Cable highlighted the issues of homelessness and unaffordable housing during a visit to Oxford, while the party's Oxford West and Abingdon MP Layla Moran argued that Labour was over-dominant on the council and that additional Lib Dem councillors would provide improved scrutiny. The party's manifesto included pledges to re-examine potential sites in Oxford in order to build "hundreds more houses", with their councillors suggesting that land designated for business development could be reallocated for housing. The Lib Dems supported a review of the Green Belt for new sites for development, with safeguards for "areas of natural, historic, or scientific interest". They proposed increased accommodation and support for homeless people, while opposing fining of rough sleepers. Other pledges included a tourism tax as a source of revenue for public works. The Lib Dem leader on the council, Andrew Gant, suggested that some voters would support the party because of opposition to Brexit.

== Candidates ==
The Labour and Conservative parties nominated candidates for all 24 seats, while the Greens contested 23 and the Liberal Democrats 21. The current Leader of the council, Susan Brown (Labour), stood for re-election in Churchill ward. David Thomas, the leader of the council's Green group who was previously elected in Holywell, contested St. Clement's against the Labour incumbent Tom Hayes.

Some councillors whose terms ended in 2018 did not seek re-election, including former Leader Bob Price (Labour, Hinksey Park) and Lord Mayor Jean Fooks (Liberal Democrat, Summertown).

== Results ==
Labour increased its majority on the council, holding 36 of 48 seats after the election. The Greens, in what the Oxford Mail described as "an awful night" for the party, saw two of their three seats up for election won by Labour, while their leader David Thomas lost his place on the Council when his attempt to win St Clement's from Labour failed. This left the party with just two councillors. The Liberal Democrats won Quarry and Risinghurst from Labour, which was Labour's first loss of a seat in Oxford since 2006.

The highest turnout was 54.9% for Iffley Fields, and the lowest 19.9% for Northfield Brook.

Oxford local election result 2018
Party	Seats	Gains	Losses	Net gain/loss	Seats %	Votes %	Votes	+/−
Labour	18	2	1	+1	75.0	47.8	18,277	+0.8
Liberal Democrats	5	1	0	+1	20.8	23.3	8,892	+5.1
Green	1	0	2	-2	4.2	14.5	5,535	-2.5
Conservative	0	0	0	0	0.0	12.9	4,938	+0.3
Independent	0	0	0	0	0.0	1.5	577	-3.0

Note: no UKIP candidates stood in this election, compared with two in 2016 and six in 2014. Two independent candidates were standing, compared with three in 2016 and four in 2014. Plus/minus percentages are calculated with respect to the 2016 Oxford City Council election. In addition to the 2 seats that Labour gained relative to the 2016 election, Labour also took back a seat they previously held that had become vacant in November 2017 (see Northfield Brook).

Total number of seats on the council after the election:

Party	Previous council	Staying councillors	Seats up for election	Election result	New council
Labour	34	18	16 (Note: Excluding Northfield Brook.)	18	36
Liberal Democrats	8	4	4	5	9
Green	4	1	3	1	2
Independent	1	1	0	0	1
Total	47	24	23	24	48

== Results by ward ==
Ward results are taken from the Oxford City Council website. Results are described as holds or gains based on comparison with the 2014 election.

=== Barton and Sandhills ===
Party	Candidate	Votes	%	±%
Labour	Martyn James Rush	812	51.7	+2.0
Conservative	Tim Patmore	268	17.1	+4.8
Independent	Chaka Artwell	252	16.1	−0.6
Liberal Democrats	Jemma Kathleen Hayward	153	9.7	+1.0
Green	Symon James Hill	85	5.4	−0.4
Turnout		1570	31.9	▲3.2
Labour hold				

=== Blackbird Leys ===
Party	Candidate	Votes	%	±%
Labour	Rae Humberstone	740	81.6	+8.6
Conservative	Paul John Sims	114	12.6	+7.5
Green	Chris Witt	53	5.8	+2.5
Turnout		907	22.3	▼0.8
Labour hold				

=== Carfax ===
Party	Candidate	Votes	%	±%
Labour	Richard George Alexander Howlett	482	42.8	+0.8
Liberal Democrats	Conor McKenzie	399	35.4	+15.0
Green	Emma Teworte	127	11.3	−14.6
Conservative	Thomas Crook	119	10.6	+0.2
Turnout		1127	36.3	▼1.1
Labour gain from Green				

=== Churchill ===
Party	Candidate	Votes	%	±%
Labour	Susan Woolford Brown	709	66.2	−1.7
Conservative	Jake Leon Whittingham	155	14.5	+1.6
Green	William David Vowell	104	9.7	−1.9
Liberal Democrats	Peter Charles Coggins	103	9.6	+2.0
Turnout		1071	25.2	▼2.2
Labour hold				

=== Cowley ===
Party	Candidate	Votes	%	±%
Labour	Christine Mary Simm	839	56.6	+0.6
Green	Hazel Dawe	350	23.6	−3.0
Conservative	Sami Hasan	179	12.1	−1.2
Liberal Democrats	Eleonore Vogel	114	7.7	+3.6
Turnout		1482	33.4	▼2.2
Labour hold				

=== Cowley Marsh ===
Party	Candidate	Votes	%	±%
Labour	Lubna Arshad	885	54.7	−0.1
Independent	Judith Anne Harley	325	20.1	+5.3
Green	Annie Pickering	207	12.8	−5.2
Liberal Democrats	Tony Brett	113	7.0	+0.4
Conservative	Alan William Gibbs	89	5.5	−0.3
Turnout		1619	36.3	▼2.2
Labour hold				

=== Headington ===
Party	Candidate	Votes	%	±%
Liberal Democrats	Mohammed Altaf-Khan	1,140	61.3	+1.6
Labour	Simon John Peter Ottino	504	27.1	+3.4
Conservative	Isa Mohammed	117	6.3	−3.0
Green	Ray Hitchins	100	5.4	−1.9
Turnout		1861	44.8	▼0.1
Liberal Democrats hold				

=== Headington Hill and Northway ===
Party	Candidate	Votes	%	±%
Labour	Joe McManners	698	51.5	−0.2
Liberal Democrats	Guy John Garden	296	21.8	+11.1
Conservative	Georgina Ruth Gibbs	250	18.5	−11.6
Green	Kate Josephine Robinson	111	8.2	+0.7
Turnout		1355	37.1	▼5.3
Labour hold				

=== Hinksey Park ===
Party	Candidate	Votes	%	±%
Labour	Alex Donnelly	1,094	65.0	−2.5
Green	Robert James Henry Paynter	228	13.5	−1.0
Liberal Democrats	Adam Charles Povey	206	12.2	+4.8
Conservative	Kate Kettle	156	9.3	−1.3
Turnout		1684	41.3	▼4.2
Labour hold				

=== Holywell ===
Party	Candidate	Votes	%	±%
Labour	Nadine Marie-Christine Bely-Summers	393	38.3	−2.6
Liberal Democrats	Finn Thomas Conway	386	37.7	+12.1
Green	Timothy John Robert Eden	153	14.9	−9.1
Conservative	David Robert Pearson	93	9.1	−0.4
Turnout		1025	41	▼2.7
Labour gain from Green				

=== Iffley Fields ===
Party	Candidate	Votes	%	±%
Labour	Richard John Joseph Tarver	1,041	48.9	+1.4
Green	Elise Danielle Benjamin	936	44.0	−1.0
Conservative	Simon James Bazley	85	4.0	−0.4
Liberal Democrats	Harry Samuels	66	3.1	0.0
Turnout		2128	54.9	▲1
Labour hold				

=== Jericho and Osney ===
Party	Candidate	Votes	%	±%
Labour	Susanna Pressel	1,424	65.9	+13.3
Green	Lois Knight Muddiman	537	24.9	−1.6
Conservative	James Moreton Wakeley	199	9.2	−0.4
Turnout		2160	47.9	▲4.7
Labour hold				

=== Littlemore ===
Party	Candidate	Votes	%	±%
Labour	Tiago Corais	845	59.3	−0.2
Conservative	Daniel Stafford	295	20.7	+0.3
Liberal Democrats	Christopher Smowton	147	10.3	+4.9
Green	Lucy Irene Ayrton	139	9.7	−5.0
Turnout		1426	30.4	▲0.4
Labour hold				

=== Lye Valley ===
Party	Candidate	Votes	%	±%
Labour	Ben Lloyd-Shogbesan	867	64.9	−0.3
Green	Kevin Nicholas McGlynn	251	18.8	+6.3
Conservative	Johnson Mackline Kyeswa	218	16.3	+1.1
Turnout		1336	27.9	▼1.5
Labour hold				

=== Marston ===
Party	Candidate	Votes	%	±%
Labour	Mary Ruth Clarkson	1,044	52.6	+17.3
Conservative	Mark Bhagwandin	580	29.2	+24.4
Liberal Democrats	Maria Bourbon	180	9.1	+6.1
Green	Alistair David Pryce Morris	180	9.1	+4.3
Turnout		1984	43.8	▼8
Labour hold				

=== North ===
Party	Candidate	Votes	%	±%
Labour	Ann Louise Upton	856	48.8	−2.5
Liberal Democrats	Ruvi Ziegler	712	40.6	+14.6
Conservative	Alexander James Curtis	185	10.6	−0.9
Turnout		1753	51.7	▲5.6
Labour hold				

=== Northfield Brook ===
Party	Candidate	Votes	%	±%
Labour	Hosnieh Djafari-Marbini	647	73.0	+2.9
Conservative	Pat Jones	106	12.0	+1.1
Liberal Democrats	Rosemary Anne Beatrice Morlin	68	7.7	−0.4
Green	Matthew James Hull	65	7.3	−0.9
Turnout		886	19.9	▲1.3
Labour hold				

The Northfield Brook seat contested at this election had been won by Labour in 2014. It was vacant between the death of Councillor Jennifer Pegg in November 2017 and the May 2018 election.

=== Quarry and Risinghurst ===
Party	Candidate	Votes	%	±%
Liberal Democrats	Roz Smith	978	44.0	+5.6
Labour	Dee Sinclair	879	39.5	−5.2
Conservative	Alex Mackenzie Smith	219	9.8	−0.4
Green	Liz Taylor	149	6.7	+0.1
Turnout		2225	48.7	▲0.9
Liberal Democrats gain from Labour				

=== Rose Hill and Iffley ===
Party	Candidate	Votes	%	±%
Labour	Shaista Aziz	997	58.0	−11.3
Conservative	Dan Gee	260	15.1	+1.5
Liberal Democrats	David William Bowkett	231	13.4	+8.1
Green	Miranda Shaw	231	13.4	+1.6
Turnout		1719	37.2	▼0.1
Labour hold				

=== St. Clement's ===
Party	Candidate	Votes	%	±%
Labour Co-op	Tom Hayes	905	58.9	+8.6
Green	David Nicholas Thomas	479	31.2	+2.6
Conservative	Luke Allen	86	5.6	−2.8
Liberal Democrats	Graham Roderick Jones	67	4.4	−8.3
Turnout		1537	41.2	▲4.2
Labour hold				

=== St. Margaret's ===
Party	Candidate	Votes	%	±%
Liberal Democrats	Paul Harris	979	60.4	+22.6
Labour	Jesse Samuel Joseph Erlam	291	17.9	−7.4
Conservative	Penelope Anne Lenon	267	16.5	−5.1
Green	Al Wilson	85	5.2	−10.1
Turnout		1622	49	▲2.7
Liberal Democrats hold				

=== St. Mary's ===
Party	Candidate	Votes	%	±%
Green	Dick Wolff	677	50.6	−1.6
Labour	Luke Daniel Louis Barbanneau	520	38.8	+0.2
Conservative	Jim Brennan	82	6.1	+1.1
Liberal Democrats	Stefanie Garden	60	4.5	+0.3
Turnout		1339	39.8	▼1.7
Green hold				

=== Summertown ===
Party	Candidate	Votes	%	±%
Liberal Democrats	Michael Leonard Gotch	1,153	52.3	+7.8
Labour	Rabyah Khan	588	26.7	−0.2
Conservative	David Roger Nimmo Smith	299	13.6	−3.6
Green	Larry Sanders	163	7.4	−4.0
Turnout		2203	48.2	▲3.5
Liberal Democrats hold				

=== Wolvercote ===
Party	Candidate	Votes	%	±%
Liberal Democrats	Steve Goddard	1,341	61.0	+15.8
Conservative	Gary William Dixon	517	23.5	−6.3
Labour	Adam John Ellison	217	9.9	−1.5
Green	Sarah Janet Edwards	125	5.7	−7.9
Turnout		2200	49.6	▲2.1
Liberal Democrats hold				
