= Oxford University Conservative Association =

University political society

- Abbreviation: OUCA
- Formation: 1924
- Type: Political society
- Location: University of Oxford
- President: Zahra Saeed, Balliol College
- Treasurer: Anneli Matthews, St Hugh's College
- Secretary: Matilda Richardson, St Catherine's College
- Political Officer: Oscar Moore, St Edmund Hall
- Website: ouconservatives.com

The Oxford University Conservative Association (OUCA) is a student Conservative association founded in 1924, whose members are drawn from the University of Oxford. Since October 2009, OUCA has been affiliated with Conservative Future and its successor, the Young Conservatives, the Conservative Party youth wing.

OUCA alumni include many prominent Conservative Party figures, including four former prime ministers of the United Kingdom and scores of former cabinet ministers and senior government officials. Among them are Margaret Thatcher, Edward Heath, David Cameron, Theresa May, William Hague, Jeremy Hunt, Sir George Young, Ann Widdecombe, Jacob Rees-Mogg and the Earl of Dartmouth. Thatcher and Heath served as presidents of the association, as did prominent British journalists Jonathan Aitken, William Rees-Mogg, Daniel Hannan and Nick Robinson. Since the 1950s, at least one ex-president has been in every Conservative cabinet. Former Labour ministers Ed Balls and Chris Bryant are also OUCA alumni.

== Governance ==
OUCA is run by its officers and committee, who are elected on a termly basis. The association has six senior officers, namely the president, the president-elect, the treasurer, the treasurer-elect, the secretary, and the political officer, who chairs Port and Policy each week and is also responsible for organising campaigning events and social action. Four junior officers also help manage the association, as do its eight committee members (two of which are appointed by officers without an election). OUCA's returning officer is responsible for running the elections and for administering the association's internal disciplinary procedures. The president may appoint non-executive officers, such as a graduate officer.

In October 2018, OUCA announced that members of the Bullingdon Club would be banned from holding office within the association, with OUCA's president stating the club's "values and activities had no place in the modern Conservative Party". This decision was overturned by the association's disciplinary committee, as non-members were brought to the council meeting that voted for the ban. Despite this, the ban was subsequently reimposed by the association's senior member, Brian Young.

== Relationship with the Conservative Party ==
OUCA members sometimes stand for election to Oxford City Council. The council has traditionally been Labour-dominated, and the Conservatives have not held a seat on it since 2001. Alexander Stafford (president, Michaelmas 2007) stood unsuccessfully for Holywell Ward in the 2008 Oxford City Council election, achieving an 8.2% swing for the Conservatives. His brother Gregory, now a councillor in the London Borough of Ealing, stood in the same ward in 2004. More recently, Poppy Stokes and OUCA president Maryam Ahmed stood for the Conservatives in the 2014 Oxford City Council Election in the Holywell and Carfax wards respectively. This trend of putting up students as candidates in the city centre continued in the 2016 city council election, when OUCA president, George Walker, stood in Holywell Ward.

== Oxford University Tory Reform Group ==
Julian Critchley described the OUCA that he encountered on his arrival at Pembroke College in 1951. Despite its 2,000 members, he said, "it was dominated by a patrician clique who preserved their power by preventing the membership at large from electing officers of the association. These were chosen by the committee which, although directly elected, was easily open to manipulation." Critchley and Michael Heseltine, defeated in their bids for OUCA office, set up a rival Conservative society, the Blue Ribbon Club.

In 1965, a group of OUCA members formed the Oxford University Tory Reform Group, pre-dating the national Tory Reform Group organisation. The OUTRG acted as a "one nation conservative" pressure group in Oxford, although it had a substantially smaller membership than OUCA. Interest declined as the national party became more moderate, and the OUTRG voted to disband and merge with OUCA during Michaelmas term 2007.

In an email to OUTRG members, its president Luke Connoly reported that an extraordinary general meeting held at the Lamb & Flag pub at 3 pm on 18 November 2007 unanimously voted to dissolve the OUTRG as of midday Saturday 8th week (1 December 2007) and to merge with OUCA. He cited falling attendance and a belief that OUCA had "genuinely become more liberal", adding that the merger "will make debate between wings of the party much easier and more productive". Later in the year, Douglas Hurd, a patron of the national TRG, lamented the disbanding of the Oxford branch, saying that it was "very important that the One Nation view is powerfully represented".

== Port and Policy ==
OUCA's hosts a regular event called 'Port and Policy', which involves port-fuelled debate, with a mixture of serious and jovial motions. Although the format is decided by the president and the political officer, two pre-announced motions are usually debated, followed by an emergency motion. Between Trinity Term 1994 and Michaelmas 2012, Port and Policy was held eight times a term on Sunday evenings in the Oxford Union. In May 2007, Port and Policy featured in the Channel 4 documentary Make Me a Tory. The growth in attendance at Port and Policy was mentioned in a 2008 Financial Times article as possible evidence of growing popularity for the Conservatives among students. In Michaelmas 2012 the Oxford Union did not renew the contract, and OUCA used other Oxford venues. While originally held by OUCA, 'Port and Policy' has become a popular event for other universities conservative associations, although the format can vary, often not being held as regularly. In January 2023, Port and Policy returned to the Oxford Union; however, following friction with the Union, Port and Policy is currently being held at various venues around Oxford.

== In the media ==
The Channel 4 documentary Make Me a Tory, produced by Daniel Cormack, aired on 13 May 2007. It included footage from one of OUCA's Port and Policy meetings and an interview with Conservative party leader David Cameron.

In Trinity term 2010, just over a week before the 2010 general election, the Oxford Mail reported John Major's visit to the association.

In Hilary term 2011, Courtney Love took part in a Port and Policy event. She joined the association, and the president appointed her non-executive officer for rock and roll.

== Controversies ==
=== No Platform Referendum (1986) ===
In December 1985 the Oxford University Student Union adopted a No Platform policy for "racists and fascists." OUCA organised a petition of almost 700 signatures, more than the minimum requirement, to put the policy to a referendum of the student union's members. OUCA President Nick Levy described the policy as "a serious infringement of the basic democratic right to freedom of speech". OUCA led the subsequent campaign to overturn the policy. No Platform was rejected by a vote of 3,152 against with 2,246 in favour in the referendum in late February 1986.

=== Racism accusations ===
In 2000, four OUCA members were expelled from a meeting for making "Nazi-style salutes". The New Statesman reported that a member of the OUCA committee at the university's 2001 Fresher's Fair greeted new students by saying, "Welcome to OUCA – the biggest political group for young people since the Hitler Youth". Another member was dismissed from the Oxford University Student Union's executive for "marching up and down doing a Nazi salute". In 2007, a drunken OUCA member gave a Nazi salute at a meeting attended by a former Tory MP.

In 2004, an ex-treasurer of the association was found guilty of bringing OUCA into disrepute "after posting 'offensive' comments about India in a newsletter". At an OUCA hustings in 2009, two candidates made racist jokes, encouraged by others present. The incident led to national media coverage and an investigation by the university, which then refused to re-register the association, forcing it to drop University from its name and become OCA (Oxford Conservative Association). As a result of the incident, two members were expelled from the national Conservative party, and the Oxford Union banned OUCA from using its premises for hustings and in-camera events.

In 2011, The Oxford Student newspaper received leaked video footage of an OUCA member singing the first line of a song glorifying the Nazi Party in the Junior Common Room of Corpus Christi College after an OUCA meeting at the Oxford Union in 2010. This led to the resignation of some current and former members of the association. The university launched an investigation into the society as a result of the reports. The dean of Corpus Christi subsequently banned all OUCA events at the college indefinitely.

In 2020, a member standing in the OUCA elections was reported to have quoted from the Rivers of Blood speech while at a drinking event. The member later resigned his membership, and dropped out of the election. During the same election, the losing presidential candidate, who would have been the association's first black president had he been elected, raised accusations that the election had been rigged against him. He was then expelled from the association after its disciplinary committee ruled that he had brought OUCA into disrepute by raising false allegations.

=== Unpaid debt (2012) ===
On 25 February 2012 The Daily Telegraph reported that the association had had an unpaid debt of more than £1,200 in relation to a charity event held "in support of the Army Benevolent Fund at the Cavalry and Guards Club on Pall Mall in June 2009", which had not been settled until the beginning of 2012. As a result of this and other administrative shortcomings, the university for a second time refused to re-register the association for a period of 12 months, during which time it was again known as OCA, regaining university affiliation at the start of Trinity term 2012.

=== Financial and interpersonal misconduct (2021) ===
On 22 October 2021, Cherwell reported that several complaints of financial and interpersonal misconduct had been made to the disciplinary committee of OUCA against the then president, Kamran Ali. The decision of the disciplinary committee to remove the president from office was overturned on appeal on procedural grounds.

=== Presidential crisis (2023) ===
On 18 May 2023, the Disciplinary Committee voted to remove Caleb van Ryneveld from the office of the presidency of OUCA, and subsequently Peter Walker, the President-elect, became acting President. Following this, Van Ryneveld appealed this decision to the Senior Member, who on 24 May 2023, decreed that Walker had no claims to the presidency and that Van Ryneveld was to resume the office. According to the OUCA constitution, the Senior Member is the 'last court of appeal' of any decision 'regardless of any other Rules', however, the judgement of the Senior Member was brought into question by Walker and other members of committee who maintained that he was still acting President.

== List of presidents ==
=== Key ===
- All Souls
- Balliol
- Brasenose
- Christ Church
- Corpus Christi
- Exeter
- Green Templeton
- Harris Manchester
- Hertford
- Jesus
- Keble
- Kellogg
- Lady Margaret Hall
- Linacre
- Lincoln
- Magdalen
- Mansfield
- Merton
- New College
- Nuffield
- Oriel
- Pembroke
- Queen's
- Regent's Park
- Somerville
- St Anne's
- St Antony's
- St Benet's
- St Catherine's
- St Cross
- St Edmund Hall
- St Hilda's
- St Hugh's
- St John's
- St Peter's
- Trinity
- University
- Wadham
- Wolfson
- Worcester

Year	
1924-25	G. E. C. Gadson
1925-26	Hugh Molson
1926-27	F. Murthwaite How
1927-28	Quintin Hogg
1928-29	Edgar Lustgarten
1929-30	Patrick Hamilton
1930-31	John Boyd-Carpenter
1931-32	Brian Davidson
1932-33	Patrick Heathcoat-Amory
1933-34	Keith Steel-Maitland

Year	Michaelmas	Hilary	Trinity
1934-35	Michael MacLagan	Ian Harvey	
1935-36	Ronald Bell	Ronald Bell	Patrick Anderson
1936-37	Patrick Anderson	J. R. J. Kerruish	J. R. J. Kerruish
1937-38	Edward Heath	Edward Heath	Hugh Fraser
1938-39		Julian Amery	
1939-40	Michael Kershaw		
1940-41	Robin Edmonds, Robin Sanderson, Michael Kinchin-Smith, J. A. T. Douglas, David Wedderburn		
1941-42	George Knight		
1942-43	Geoffrey Rippon		
1943-44	A. H. Head, O. W. Olsen		
1944-45	I. N. Wilkinson	Ronald Brown	Peter Braund
1945-46	Rachel Willink	Margaret Roberts	
1946-47		Stanley Moss	E. O. Williams-Walker
1947-48	Maurice Chandler	C. J. Mandelbury	A. L. Price
1948-49	Moira Armstrong		
1949-50	Anthony Berry and Paul Dean	Ronald Watkins	David Waddington
1950-51	William Rees-Mogg		
1951-52	Alasdair Morrison and Elizabeth Robbins	Patrick Mayhew	Robin Cooke
1952-53	Andrew Cuninghame	Ian McLaughlin	Robin Maxwell-Hyslop
1953-54	Swinton Thomas	Martin Morton	Denis Orde
1954-55	John Pattison	Guy Arnold	Owen Leigh-Williams
1955-56	Elgar Jenkins	Carl Ganz	Bob Tanner
1956-57	Humphrey Crum-Ewing	Toby Jessel	Kenneth Baker
1957-58	Tony Newton	Paul Channon	Patrick Ground
1958-59	Alan Haselhurst	Michael Kemp	Colin Goodwin
1959-60	Christopher Buckmaster	Michael Wadsworth	Phillip Whitehead
1960-61	John McDonnell	John Malcolm	Aubrey Houston-Bowden
1961-62	Peter Udell	David Keene	Anthony Hart
1962-63	Colin Craig	Jonathan Aitken	Toby Eckersley
1963-64	Lord James Douglas-Hamilton	Roger Freeman	Steven Dollond
1964-65	Paul Hitchings	John Appleby	Thomas Tickell
1965-66	Julian Paul	Anthony Bird	Tom Veitch
1966-67	John Nesbit	Michael Preston	William Waldegrave
1967-68	Christopher Murphy	Mark Robinson	Julian Ashby
1968-69	Tim Smith	Stephen Milligan	Anthony Speaight
1969-70	David Heathcoat-Amory; Andrew Dalton	Nigel Waterson	Nigel Murray
1970-71	Iain Horsburgh	Nicolas Turner	Josslyn Gore-Booth
1971-72	Sarah Rippon	Andrew Williams	Charles Ponsonby
1972-73	Anthony Russell	David Gilmour	John Dear
1973-74	Nick Field-Johnson	John Williams	David Soskin
1974-75	Julian Brazier	Alan Amos	Nicola Perrin
1975-76	Andrew Elliott	David Walker-Smith	Michael Parker
1976-77	Edward Bickham	Anthony Fry	Dominic Grieve
1977-78	Jane Digby	Nicholas Leviseur	Andrew Stuttaford
1978-79	Stephen Massey	John Mackintosh	Michael Thompson
1979-80	John Wood	Andrew Pelling	Richard Old
1980-81	Guy Hands	William Hague	Peter Havey
1981-82	Sally Littlejohn	Neale Stevenson	Vivien Godfrey
1982-83	Melvyn Stride	Richard Fuller	John Godfrey
1983-84	Jonathan Lord	Stephen Diggle	Andy Street
1984-85	Nick Botterill	Nick Robinson	Chris Saul
1985-86	Marc Jones	Nick Levy	Andrew Hordern
1986-87	Matthew Willsher	Jane Varley	Andrew Mennear
1987-88	Jeremy Hunt	Anthony Parsons	Hugh Harper
1988-89	Lee Roberts	Steve Best	Sarah Wardle
1989-90	Jonathan Mills	Henry Rugh	Adrian Pepper
1990-91	Richard Thompson	Jacob Rees-Mogg	Huw Phillips
1991-92	Guy Strafford	Ben Williams	Daniel Hannan
1992-93	David Sefton	Giles Taylor	Christen Thompson
1993-94	David Blair	Lindy Cameron	George Williamson
1994-95	Jonathan Hough	Damian Collins	Sebastian Madden
1995-96	Gareth Haver	Adrian Blair	Ben Holland
1996-97	Patrick Huggard	Alasdair Foster	Simon Davidson
1997-98	Ian Troughton and Carmel Togher	Paul Thornton	Nick Donavan
1998-99	Neil Edmond	Stephen Ireton	Stephen Doody
1999-2000	Toby Boutle	Nick Yarker	Stefanie Atchinson
2000-01	Gabriel Rozenberg	William Charles	Marcus Walker
2001-02	Nicholas Bennett	Edmund Sutton	Jamie Gardiner
2002-03	Marc Stoneham	Edward Tomlinson	John Townsend
2003-04	Oliver Pepys	Blair Gibbs	Andrew Harper
2004-05	Timothy Ayles	Matthew Smith	Alexander Samuels
2005-06	Christopher Ware	Sophie Steele	Simon Clarke
2006-07	Charlie Steel	Ian Wellby	Sam Belcher
2007-08	Alexander Stafford	Christopher Pickard	Guy Levin
2008-09	Ernest Bell	Niall Gallagher	Anthony Boutall
2009-10	Alexander Elias	Oliver Harvey	Natalie Shina
2010-11	Andrew Mason	Henry Evans	Joe Cooke
2011-12	James Lawson	Miles Coates	Nina Fischer
2012-13	George Mawhinney	Adam Wozniak	Stephanie Cherrill
2013-14	Robert Greig	Jack Matthews	James Heywood
2014-15	Rupert Cunningham	Benjamin Crompton	Maryam Ahmed
2015-16	Jan Nedvídek	Thomas Jackson	George Walker
2016-17	Harrison Edmonds	Matthew Burwood	William R. Rees-Mogg
2017-18	Edward McBarnet	Timothy Doyle	Alexander Bruce
2018-19	Ben Etty	James Beaumont	Ellie Flint
2019-20	Toby Morrison	Marcus Walford	Julia Hussain
2020–21	Annabelle Fuller	Adam James	Aurora Guerrini
2021–22	Kamran Ali; Frankie Wright (Acting)	Frankie Wright	Tatiana Quintavalle
2022–23	Juan Dávila	Charles Aslet	Caleb Van Ryneveld; Peter Walker (Acting)
2023–24	Peter Walker; Franek Bednarski (Acting)	Franek Bednarski	Hugo Roma Wilson
2024-25	Matty Vincent Brown	Christopher Collins	Edmund Smith
2025-26	Joseph Kay	Maya Kapila	Harriet Dolby
2026-27	Zahra Saeed	Aarav Desai	

== See also ==
- Oxford University Liberal Democrats
- Oxford University Labour Club
