= Alexander Curtis (British politician) =

British politician

Councillor Alexander Curtis

Mayor of Ware
- In office 22 May 2017 – 21 May 2018
- Deputy Mayor: Cllr Michael Standley
- Preceded by: Cllr Jonathan Kaye
- Succeeded by: Cllr David Oldridge

Mayor of Ware
- In office 11 May 2020 – 17 May 2021
- Deputy Mayor: Cllr Ian Kemp
- Preceded by: Cllr Nina Villa
- Succeeded by: Cllr Ian Kemp

East Hertfordshire District Councillor
- In office 2 May 2019 – May 2023
- Constituency: Great Amwell

Ware Town Councillor
- In office 7 May 2015 – May 2023
- Constituency: Christchurch Ward (2015 to 2019), Chadwell Ward (2019 to 2023)

Broxbourne Borough Councillor
- In office May 2023 – Incumbent
- Constituency: Hoddesdon Town and Rye Park Ward

Hertfordshire County Councillor
- In office May 2025 – Incumbent
- Constituency: Hoddesdon North Ward

Personal details
- Born: 24 January 1997 (age 29) Welwyn Garden City, Hertfordshire, United Kingdom
- Party: Conservative
- Education: St Catherine's College, Oxford (BA) University College London (MSc)
- Known for: Youngest Mayor in Europe

Alexander Curtis (born 24 January 1997) is a British politician who was Mayor of Ware. Elected at the age of 20 in 2017, he is thought to have been one of the youngest mayors in Europe, and the second-youngest mayor in modern British history.

In addition, Curtis served as Chairman of Hertford and Stortford Conservative Association from 2017 to 2020, thus also sitting (ex officio) as the youngest member of the National Conservative Convention.

== Education ==
Curtis read for a Bachelor of Arts in Geography at St Catherine's College, a constituent college of the University of Oxford, where he received a prize-nominated First Class Honours degree in Geography. At Oxford, Curtis engaged actively in student politics, being elected as a trustee of Oxford University Student Union and as a NUS delegate. Curtis also worked in the editorial team of the student newspaper, Cherwell, and in the business team of its parent company, Oxford Student Publications Limited. Furthermore, he served as Treasurer of the university's branch of the UK United Nations Association and Secretary-General of Oxford University International Model United Nations. He also stood as a Conservative Party candidate in elections to Oxford City Council in 2016 and 2018, as well as in elections to Oxfordshire County Council in 2017.

Subsequently, Curtis read for a Master of Science in Geoscience at University College London.

== Politics ==
Curtis first became involved in politics in 2011, aged 14, when he became the founding chairman of Ware Youth Town Council. He subsequently joined the local Conservative Party aged 15, gained the nomination for a vacant Christchurch Ward seat in the run-up to the 2015 town council elections aged 17, and was elected at age 18.

He was subsequently elected to the position of mayor – a largely ceremonial role – by his fellow councillors (all Conservative) in 2017. Going beyond his ceremonial duties, Curtis publicly backed plans to transform the former Ware Town Hall from a shop into a wine bar.

=== Controversies ===
In late March 2018, Curtis attracted controversy when he unilaterally announced via the official Ware Town Council Twitter account that a public meeting had been cancelled, on the day of that meeting. This drew criticism from fellow councillors, particularly as he later announced on his personal account that he had travelled to Glasgow. Curtis went on to claim that his decision to cancel the meeting was unrelated to his travels, instead citing delays in internal reporting as the cause for the cancellation. Fellow councillors called this "ridiculous", stating that meetings should only be cancelled in the case of a "major crisis".

Members of the public who wished to attend the meeting also expressed their disappointment, as the cancellation prevented public input on the council's response to a local redevelopment consultation. Seven members of the Council attempted to hold a public meeting regardless, but were forced to eject the press and public when it became apparent that no member of council staff was coming to take minutes. They were nonetheless able to conduct a private council meeting.

On 9 April 2018, a selection of members of the Conservative group at Ware Town Council, who constitute the entirety of that council, met privately to withdraw the Conservative whip from Curtis, asserting that he now sits as an independent. However, this was confirmed not to be the case by the local Conservative Association, of which he was the Chair.

Curtis alleges that this action was taken maliciously by fellow councillors in retaliation for his support of ongoing investigations against them. Several councillors who took part in the meeting have had Code of Conduct complaints made against them by council staff, including Cllr Jeannette Taylor, Cllr Rosalie Standley, and her husband, Deputy Mayor Cllr Michael Standley. These 3 councillors were suspended from the Conservative whip and sat for the remainder of their terms as independents; they did not stand again in the District and Town Council elections in 2019. The conflict was seized upon by members of the local opposition parties, the Liberal Democrats and Labour, who argued that the conflict had resulted in unnecessary expenditures of tax money.

In May 2020, Curtis was elected for a second one-year term as Mayor of Ware.

In May 2023, Curtis stepped down from his Ware roles and was elected as a Borough Councillor in Broxbourne, also becoming a Hertfordshire County Councillor in May 2025.

== See also ==
- Local government in England
- Mhairi Black MP, the youngest member of the House of Commons, having been elected aged 20
- Ross Greer MSP, youngest member of the Scottish Parliament, having been elected aged 21
