= Lord Willis =

Lord Willis may refer to:

- Ted Willis, Baron Willis (1914–1992), British playwright, novelist and screenwriter
- Phil Willis, Baron Willis of Knaresborough (born 1941), British Liberal Democrat politician

== See also ==
- Katherine Willis, Baroness Willis of Summertown (born 1964), British biologist
