= No Platform =

Denial of a platform to speak

No Platform is a form of student boycott in the United Kingdom where a person or organisation is denied a platform to speak. The British National Union of Students (NUS) established its No Platform policy in April 1974. Like other no-platforming policies, it asserts that no proscribed person or organisation should be given a platform to speak, nor should a union officer share a platform with them. The policy traditionally applies to entities that the NUS considers racist or fascist, most notably the British National Party, although the NUS and its liberation campaigns have policies refusing platforms to other people or organisations. The policy does not extend to students' unions who are part of NUS, although similar policies have also been adopted by its constituent unions.

== Policy content ==
The No Platform policy, as defined in the NUS's articles of association, provides that no "individuals or members of organisations or groups identified by the Democratic Procedures Committee as holding racist or fascist views" may stand for election to any NUS position, or attend or speak at any NUS function or conference. Furthermore, officers, committee members, or trustees may not share a platform with any racist or fascist. The list of proscribed organisations, as of April 2015, includes the following organisations:

- Al-Muhajiroun
- British National Party
- English Defence League
- Hizb-ut-Tahrir
- Muslim Public Affairs Committee UK
- National Action

The NUS also has policy refusing platforms to people or organisations for other reasons: the NUS LGBT Campaign (and formerly, also the Women's Campaign) refuses platforms to those they consider to be transphobic, including Julie Bindel; and the National Executive Committee has a policy refusing a platform to those it considers to be rape deniers or rape apologists, following George Galloway's statements about rape when asked about the allegations of sexual assault facing Julian Assange.

== Controversies ==
The policy attracts criticism from people who consider it to be censorship.

Following the adoption in December 1985 of a No Platform policy by the Oxford University Student Union, the Oxford University Conservative Association organised a petition of almost 700 signatures, more than the minimum requirement, to put the policy to a referendum of the student union's members. In late February 1986, the No Platform policy was overturned by a vote of 3,152 against with 2,246 in favour.

Students' unions in Durham, Leicester, Newcastle and Salford have all had attempts to overturn No Platform policies. In 2013, the London School of Economics Students' Union General Meeting voted, 431–172, to reject No Platform.

In 2007, debate surfaced in the University of Oxford about the policy when British National Party leader Nick Griffin was scheduled to appear on the university's student radio station, Oxide Radio. At that time, the station did not have editorial independence from its parent company, Oxford Student Services Limited, the commercial subsidiary of the Oxford University Student Union. OUSU backed the NUS decision, but in 2007 the Oxford Union (the debating society, which is self-governing, not affiliated to either OUSU or the NUS, and indeed independent of the University of Oxford, in spite of most of its members being from that institution), invited Nick Griffin along with British writer and Holocaust denier David Irving to speak. Members of the Student Union picketed the debate and some protesters broke into the Union chambers before being ejected by security. Subsequently, Oxide Radio was granted editorial independence from OUSU. In a similar way, the Cambridge Union opposes the principle of No Platform in both its actions and laws, despite its support by the Cambridge University Students' Union. In the past, this policy has resulted in student protests against the hosting of speakers such as Universities Minister David Willetts, government minister Eric Pickles (during which the building was broken into), Marine Le Pen and Julian Assange.

In February 2010, two NUS officers forced the cancellation of a proposed debate on multiculturalism which was scheduled to include British National Party MEP Andrew Brons at the University of Durham. These actions caused controversy within the Durham student body. The debate, organised by Durham Union Society, was to have featured two prominent British National Party members: Andrew Brons MEP and Leeds City Councillor Chris Beverley. Upon hearing of BNP involvement in the debate, then-NUS Black Students' Officer (and future MP) Bellavia Ribeiro-Addy, and NUS LGBT Officer Daf Adley, jointly sent a letter to both Durham Union Society and the university demanding its cancellation. The pair incorrectly stated that the debate would be illegal and threatened to organise a "colossal demonstration" in tandem with Unite Against Fascism, adding that "if any students are hurt in and around this event responsibility will lie with you". The subsequent cancellation of the debate by Durham Union Society President Anna Birley on safety grounds was met with fierce backlash. NUS President Wes Streeting was prompted to personally appear before Durham Union Society to apologise for the actions of the officers concerned, while some Durham students protested outside the debating chamber. A protest group on Facebook quickly amassed over 2,500 members. An official petition was soon lodged with Durham Students Union to call for a referendum on disaffiliation from NUS. On 12 March 2010, the referendum concluded with a majority of voting students having voted to disaffiliate. In January 2011, they decided to reaffiliate.

== Legislative response ==
Section 43 of the Education (No. 2) Act 1986, enacted in response to the rise of No Platform policies in the mid-1980s, imposes a duty on universities to ensure that groups and individuals are not denied the use of facilities on account of their beliefs or views. In February 2021, the Conservative Education Secretary, Gavin Williamson, announced that the government would bring forward a law to extend this duty to students' unions. The Higher Education (Freedom of Speech) Bill was announced in the 2021 Queen's Speech and given its First Reading before Parliament accordingly on 12 May 2021. The bill would allow speakers at universities to seek compensation for no-platforming, impose fines on universities and students' unions with No Platform policies, and establish a new ombudsman charged with monitoring cases of no-platforming and academic dismissals.
