= Oxford University Broadcasting Society =

The Oxford University Broadcasting Society (OUBS) was a student society at the University of Oxford, England. It covered radio and television broadcasting.

The officers include a president, secretary, treasurer, programme coordinator, technical director, news editor, social secretary, and two ordinary committee members. Equipment included a Uher 4000L portable tape recorder.

== Collaboration ==
For some years, OUBS used the BBC Radio Oxford studio in Wellington Square, Oxford to produce radio programmes for Radio Oxford and the Oxford Hospitals Broadcasting Association (OHBA), (later known as Radio Cherwell from 1967) It also used the studios at the Churchill Hospital, Oxford, home of the Oxford Hospitals Broadcasting Association, which ran a radio station known as Radio Cherwell.

Aubrey Singer, controller of BBC2, spoke to the society in 1975.

== Former members ==
- Jackie Ashley
- Zeinab Badawi
- Tim Beech
- Jonathan Bowen
- Angus Deayton
- Sally Jones
- Robert Orchard
- Nigel Rees
- Carol Sennett (née Tarr)
- John Shaw

== See also ==
- Oxide Radio (started 2001)
