= Farida Anwar =

British politician (1946–2025)

Cllr Farida Anwar

Oxford City Councillor Headington Hill and Northway
- In office 8 May 2014 – 6 February 2025
- Preceded by: Roy Darke

Personal details
- Born: 1946 Faridpur District, East Bengal, Pakistan (now Bangladesh)
- Died: February 6, 2025 (aged 78–79) Oxford, United Kingdom
- Party: Labour
- Spouse: Sayedul Hague
- Children: 1
- Parent(s): Mohammad Israil Huq (father); Salema Khatun (mother)
- Profession: Politician

Farida Anwar (Bengali: ফরিদা আনোয়ার; 1946; February 6, 2025) was a British Labour Party politician and councillor for Headington Hill and Northway in Oxford City Council. In 2014, she became Oxfordshire's first city councillor from a Bangladeshi background.

== Early life ==
Anwar was born in the Faridpur District, East Bengal, Pakistan (now Bangladesh). Her late father is former civil servant, Shah Muhammad Israil Haq, who settled in the UK in 1965 and held senior positions in British Civil Service, retired as a Joint Secretary in Bangladesh Civil Service and is directly related to the family of Sheikh Mujibur Rahman. Her late mother is Salema Khatun. Anwar has five brothers and one sister, elder brother is the Vice Chancellor of University of Barisal, another brother is a professor of City University of New York, and the remaining three brothers are in Bangladesh Civil Service.

In 1966, Anwar came to the United Kingdom as a student. She has a BA (Hons) in Politics, Economics and English, a Higher Management Qualification and a Teaching Qualification.

== Career ==
Anwar worked as a civil servant in the Department for Health and Social Security for 19 years. In 1987, she was appointed as a Team Manager of Home Care Section at Social Service Department in London Borough of Camden. In 1991, she was promoted to the position of Commissioner of Housing and Social Care Department.

After working about 40 years in British Civil Service and local government, Anwar took early retirement in 2007 to join the Labour Party. In May 2014, in the Oxford City Council election, Anwar was elected as councillor for Headington Hill and Northway, winning a majority of nearly 300 and becoming Oxfordshire's first city councillor from a Bangladeshi background.

Anwar is an elected committee member for UNISON, an elected member of the Oxfordshire Council for Community Relations, a member of the Thames Valley Police Consultative Committee, a member of the executive committee of the former Oxfordshire Council for Community Relations and an honorary secretary of the Oxfordshire Bangladeshi Association. She is one of the founders of Oxford Asian Cultural Centre, a governor of St. Michael CE Primary School in Oxford where she has chaired Community and Preschool Committee and an elected member of London Moorfields Eye Hospital Patients' and Governing Body.

== Personal life ==
Anwar is a practising Muslim, is married to Sayedul Hague and a grandmother of three. Her only daughter, Fahmida, is an Oxford Graduate who works at the University of Oxford in the Postgraduate Research Centre.

Anwar lived in Headley Way, Headington, Oxford for about 40 years. She died on February 6, 2025 in the same place.

== See also ==
- British Bangladeshi
- List of British Bangladeshis
- List of ethnic minority politicians in the United Kingdom
