= John Shaw (broadcaster) =

English radio broadcaster (1957-2013)

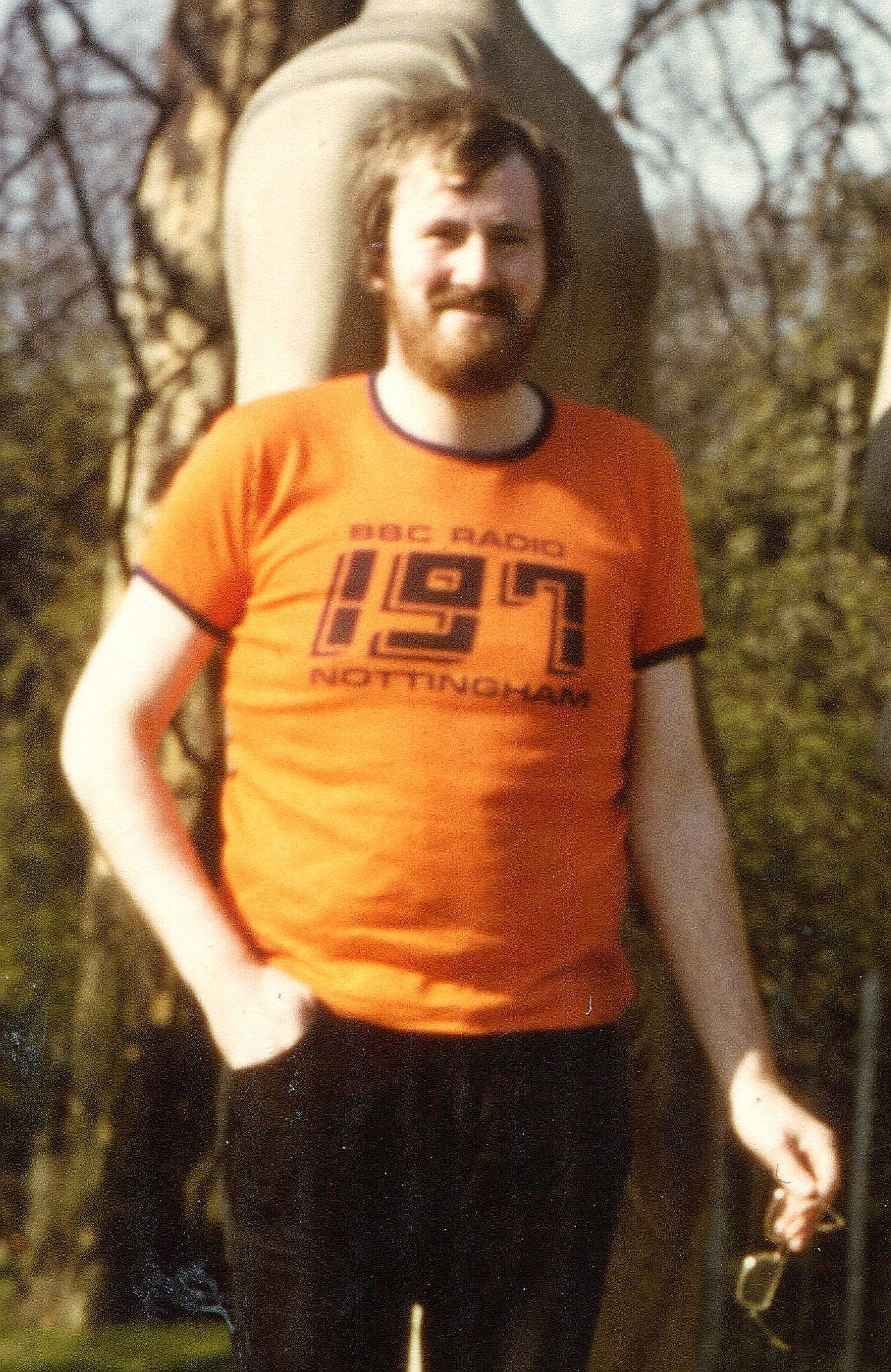
- Shaw in a BBC Radio Nottingham T-shirt
- Born: 15 August 1957; Lincoln, England
- Died: 25 November 2013 (aged 56)
- Presenting career
- Stations: Radio Nottingham; Radio Leicester; Radio Trent
- Country: United Kingdom

John Shaw (15 August 1957 – 25 November 2013) was an English radio broadcaster, specialising in music and sports commentating.

Shaw was born in the city of Lincoln (county town of Lincolnshire) and was brought up in the village of Wymeswold, Leicestershire. He was educated at Wymeswold School, Loughborough Grammar School, and Keble College, Oxford. At Oxford University, he was a member of the Oxford University Broadcasting Society. His career was spent as a music and sports broadcaster, especially cricket commentary, or BBC radio stations such as Radio Nottingham and Radio Leicester, as well independent stations such as Radio Trent (later Trent FM). He died after a short illness (leptospirosis), aged 56.

John Shaw has been likened to the broadcaster John Peel (a great influence of his) in his musical eclecticism and breadth of knowledge. A 3-hour tribute radio programme for John Shaw, including members of the band Fairport Convention, was broadcast on 20 January 2014.
