= Stephen Massey, Baron Massey of Hampstead =

British financier

The Right Honourable The Lord Massey of Hampstead
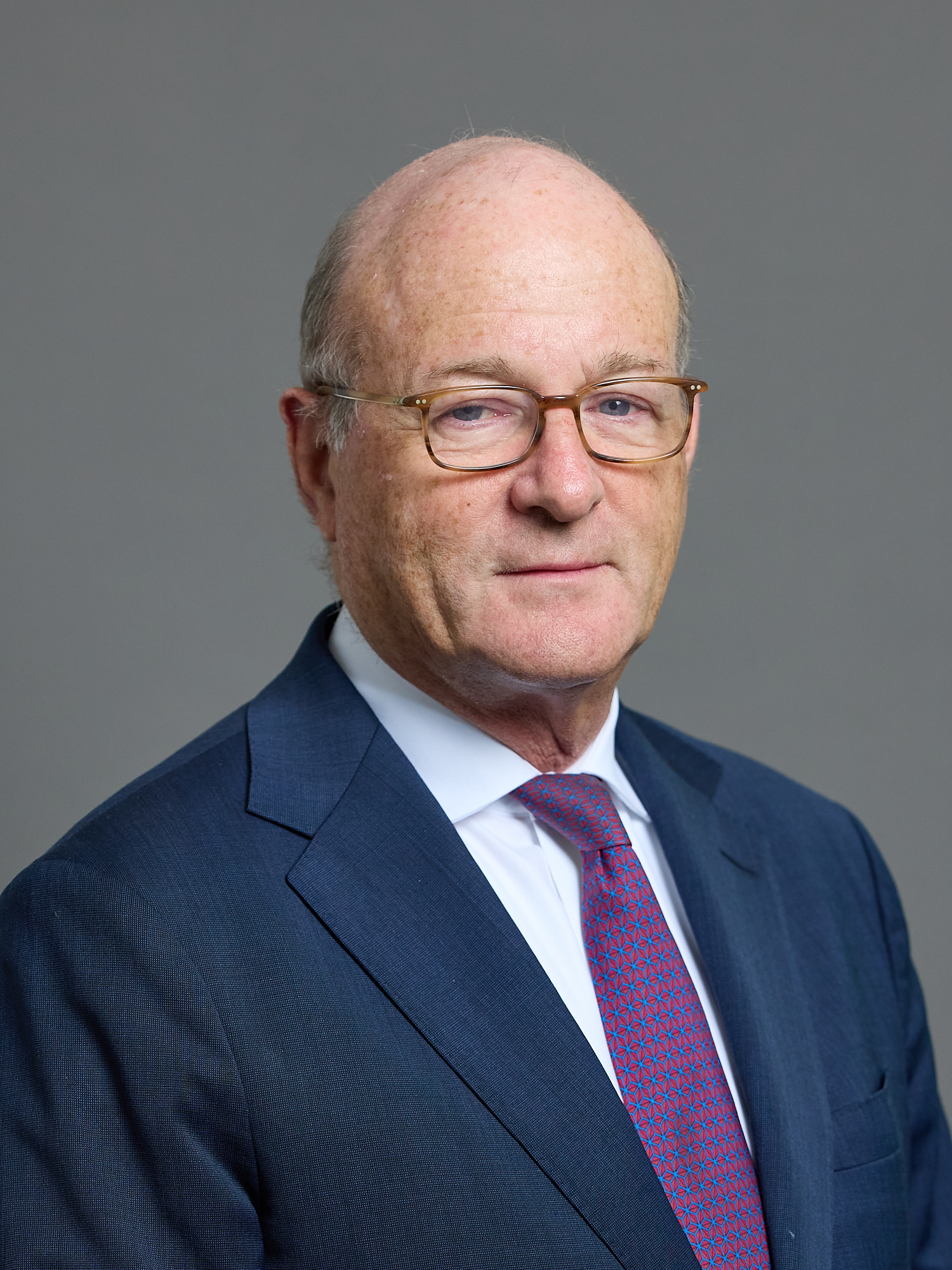
- Official portrait, 2025

Member of the House of Lords
- Lord Temporal
- Life peerage 12 May 2025

CEO of the Conservative Party
- In office November 2022 – December 2024

Personal details
- Born: Stephen Leigh Massey; September 1957 (age 69)
- Party: Conservative
- Education: Hertford College, Oxford

Stephen Leigh Massey, Baron Massey of Hampstead (born September 1957) is a British financier and politician. A supporter of Rishi Sunak, he was chief executive of the Conservative Party from November 2022 to December 2024.

== Early life ==
Massey was born in London in September 1957, his grandparents were Ukrainians who fled Odesa and migrated to England.

A fluent French speaker, he was educated at the Lycee Francais de Londres. In 1976, he matriculated at Hertford College, Oxford to study politics, philosophy and economics (PPE). While studying at the University of Oxford, he w as President of the Oxford University Conservative Association in 1978.

== Political ==
He continued his political activism after University, active in Hampstead and Highgate and subsequently became Chairman and remains Patron of the Association.

As a student, he carried out research for Peter Walker MP and later for William Waldegrave MP.

He was treasurer of the Conservative Friends of Israel (CFI) from 2010 to 2022, before being its chair in 2022.

He was appointed as Chief Executive of the Conservative Party from November 2022 to December 2024.

As part of Rishi Sunak’s Resignation Honours in April 2025, it was announced that he was to be made a life peer; he was created as Baron Massey of Hampstead, of Lacock in the County of Wiltshire on 12 May 2025. He was introduced to the House of Lords the next day, where he sits as a Conservative Party peer.

== Career ==
He first worked in the City in 1975, when as a seventeen year old, he dealt in Gilts on the floor of the exchange for Philips and Drew. He resumed his financial career after University with Prudential- Bache International in 1981. He joined as a trainee and became Chairman and Chief Executive in 2000. As president of the International and Global Derivatives division he had responsibility for all securities activities outside the US.

In December 2003, he joined the Board of Eden Group, a stockbroking and asset management firm. In 2005, he founded Eden Financial, a spin off of Eden Group and became Executive Chairman and major shareholder. In 2012, Eden was acquired by Canaccord Genuity and Massey became Chairman of its wealth management division. In 2019, he became chairman of Canaccord’s capital markets and investment banking subsidiary.

== Personal ==
He married Fiorella from Venice in 1984 and they have three children. He resides in Hampstead, London and Lacock, Wiltshire.
