= Oxide Radio =

Coordinates: 51°45′07″N 1°15′37″W

- Oxford, England; England
- Broadcast area: Oxford University and worldwide (Internet)

Programming
- Language: England
- Format: Online

Ownership
- Owner: Oxford University Student Union

History
- First air date: 2001

Links
- Webcast: stream
- Website: www.oxideradio.live

Oxide Radio is a student radio station run by members of Oxford University in Oxford, England. It was established in 2001 and as Altered Radio made brief forays onto FM in 2004 and 2005 before complications regarding FM licensing and funding forced it onto Internet-only broadcast. It relaunched in Michaelmas Term 2017 with a rebranded interface and website and now broadcasts 24/7.

It features a wide range of different shows that broadcast throughout the Oxford term: music shows of all genres, from indie tracks to Nordic tunes; chat shows featuring student agony aunts, or interviews with people affiliated with Oxford; forays into contemporary vibe culture; and plenty of news and sport for good measure too covering stories in Oxford and further afield.

Despite its very limited central University funding, since 2009 Oxide Radio has allowed any students to get involved with the society, without any subscription charges or fees, giving students the opportunity to share their passions and voice with a global audience.

== History ==
Logo used between 2005 and 2009

Oxide Radio was founded in 2001 spearheaded by Simon Demetriou, following the demise of the previous student radio station, Oxygen FM. Broadcasting from 1997 to 2001, Oxygen FM was Oxford University's student radio station, which was based in the Westgate Centre, broadcast full-time on FM as well as an internet stream. Oxygen's closure came about as a result of fabricating a whole day's programming in an attempt to deceive the Radio Authority, which led to a record fine of £20,000 and a shortening of the broadcast licence by two years, the most serious sanctions the Authority had ever imposed.

Given that the expiry of Oxygen FM's licence and the subsequent dissolution of the organisation had left students without a station, a new station was formed in 2001 as Fusion FM, before becoming Oxford Student Radio approximately 10 months later. It was then rebranded as Altered Radio in 2003. Initially broadcasting from an office in Little Clarendon Street, Oxford, the station transferred ownership to OSSL (Oxford Student Services Limited, the financial arm of the university's Student Union), and was accommodated in the student union buildings in 2003.

A third rebranding to Oxide Radio was shortly followed by the impact of a Student Union financial crisis. In significant monetary difficulties during 2006, OUSU cut Oxide's £5,700 per year budget completely and presenters were forced to pay membership dues to keep the station afloat. This has since been reverted but the cuts did see an increased move towards the application for sponsorship.

=== Nick Griffin controversy ===
In Hilary Term 2007, British National Party leader Nick Griffin was invited to speak on Oxide. Despite the presenters receiving death threats, the broadcast was scheduled to go ahead until OUSU (the university's student union) demanded that the broadcast be cancelled as part of their "No Platform Policy". Griffin criticised the decision by saying, "Fundamentally, this is not only an attack on freedom of speech but an attack on Oxford students' rights to hear things and make their own minds up." Nick Griffin and David Irving, the controversial historian, were later invited to speak at the Oxford Union about free speech, the cancelled Oxide show cited as one of the reasons for the invitation being extended. As a result of this controversy, Oxide Radio was granted editorial independence from OUSU and its own constitution.

=== January 2009 relaunch ===
Logo used during 2009–2017

The station began broadcasting once more on 18 January 2009; previous station manager Katie Traxton (08-09) returned to present a valedictory edition of her past show "Sunday Lunch.".

The first week saw a number of technical difficulties and the Head of Technical, Richard Fine posted a postmortem at the end of the week reviewing the problems and discussing solutions. The second week of broadcasting went much more smoothly, with most shows being delivered on schedule, and almost no dead air. Relying almost entirely on freeware or student-designed systems, Oxide now prides itself on its technical and financial independence in an increasingly commercialised world. Whilst there are still reports that the broadcast is not accessible in some colleges due to restrictions on internet radio usage, it is now freely accessible via iTunes and the programmes' Radio section.

=== 2017 relaunch ===
Following two years of dormancy after a series of limiting handovers, Oxide was rebranded and relaunched in Michaelmas Term 2017 after a new committee had been appointed during the summer. It coincided with OUSU moving their office space and a new studio was founded. Broadcasting began on Tuesday 10 October 2017 (1st week MT) with an interview with Chris Patten, the university's chancellor at the time followed by two music shows. In the second week of broadcasting a lot more shows were added to the schedule after due training had been given to non-committee members.

In February 2023, Oxide, along with the university's Recording Society, held an interview with Jamie Stewart of the group Xiu Xiu, hosted by Leo Brnicanin, one of the station managers.

== Technical information ==
Since January 2009, the station has been running on a heavily computer-based setup. The core component is the open-source broadcasting suite Rivendell, which maintains a central database of available music and audio, tracks audio usage for licensing reports, and handles automated playback of broadcast logs. Significantly, the use of this system has allowed many shows on the station to pre-record their episodes for playback later, relaxing the time constraints on presenters. The easy availability and size of the audio database has also encouraged some shows like 'Sliced Bread' to begin experimenting with things like sound effects.

In 2012, after years of enduring technical breakdowns and software crashes, Oxide Radio successfully gained OUSU funding to transform the technical architecture from an outdated Linux-based setup to a Mac OS X based system with new mixers, microphones, and software. Technical guidance was provided by the university's IT services, but all work was completed by committee at the time.

In 2017, as part of the relaunch, and as a consequence of OUSU moving their offices, a new Oxide studio was created and kitted out with a brand new mixer and microphones. The Technical Officer, Jethro Lundie Brown (17-18), was instrumental in configuring the new setup and wrote the majority of the new presenter's manual.

The current Oxide Radio website was developed by the committee in 2017 using the SquareSpace platform. This has provided the opportunity for the Oxide to showcase the full scope of outputs the society creates and curates. The site receives several thousand daily visitors from all over the country.

The station currently broadcasts a single 128-kilobit MP3 stream through an Icecast2 server.

== Awards ==
- BBC Radio 1 Student Radio Awards Bronze 2003: Newcomer of the Year
- BBC Radio 1 Student Radio Awards Gold 2003: Best Female Presenter
- Student Radio Awards Gold 2005: Off-Air Promotions and Imaging
- Student Radio Awards Bronze 2006: Best Specialist Music Programme
- Student Radio Awards Bronze 2007: Student Radio Newcomer of the Year

== See also ==
- Oxford University Broadcasting Society
