= 2016 Oxford City Council election =

2016 UK local government election

- 5 May 2016

24 of 48 seats to Oxford City Council 25 seats needed for a majority
	First party	Second party	Third party
Party	Labour	Liberal Democrats	Green
Seats before	33	8	6
Seats after	35	8	4
- Results of the 2016 Oxford City Council election
Elected Leader of the Council
Susan Brown
Labour

The elections for Oxford City Council took place on 5 May 2016. This was on the same day as other local elections. As Oxford City Council is elected by halves, one seat in each of the 24 wards is up for election.

Overall turnout was 39.2%. The highest turnout was 53.9% for Iffley Fields, and the lowest 18.6% for Northfield Brook.

== Results summary ==
Oxford local election result 2016
Party	Seats	Gains	Losses	Net gain/loss	Seats %	Votes %	Votes	+/−
Labour	18	2	0	+2	75	47.0	17,965	+5.8
Liberal Democrats	4	0	0	0	16.7	18.1	6,932	-0.7
Green	1	0	2	-2	4.2	16.9	6,477	-3.2
Independent	1	0	0	0	4.2	4.5	1,707	+3.4
Conservative	0	0	0	0	0	12.7	4,838	-3.1
UKIP	0	0	0	0	0	0.6	235	-2.3
TUSC	0	0	0	0	0	0.1	57	+0.1
Monster Raving Loony	0	0	0	0	0	0.03	13	-0.07

Note: two UKIP candidates stood in this election, compared with six in 2014 and three in 2012. Three independent candidates were standing, compared with four in 2014 and one in 2012. Plus/minus percentages are calculated with respect to the 2014 Oxford City Council election.

Total number of seats on the council after the election:

Party	Previous council	Staying councillors	Seats up for election	Election result	New council
Labour	33	17	16	18	35
Liberal Democrats	8	4	4	4	8
Green	6	3	3	1	4
Independent	1	0	1	1	1
Total	48	24	24	24	48

== Results by ward ==
Map of the Oxford Wards

=== Barton and Sandhills ===
+6.8

Party	Candidate	Votes	%	±%
Labour Co-op	Michael Derek Rowley	704	49.7	−1.1
Independent	Chaka Artwell	237	16.7	+16.7
Conservative	Timothy Stephen Hamer	174	12.3	−1.0
Liberal Democrats	Barbara Lesley Mallinder	123	8.7	+1.8
UKIP	Frances Baxter	96	6.8	−12.5
Green	Raymond Leslie Hitchens	82	5.8	−2.2
Turnout		1416	28.7	
Labour hold				

=== Blackbird Leys ===
Party	Candidate	Votes	%	±%
Labour	Linda Kay Smith	687	73	+5.7
UKIP	Joseph Lawes	139	14.8	−5.7
Conservative	Vanessa Elizabeth Bhagwandin	48	5.1	−0.6
Green	Matthew Ledbury	31	3.3	−1.2
TUSC	Gregory Gordon William Collier	20	2.1	+2.1
Liberal Democrats	Simon Andrew Blakey	16	1.7	−0.3
Turnout		941	23.1	
Labour hold				

=== Carfax ===
Party	Candidate	Votes	%	±%
Labour	Alexander J. Hollingsworth	447	42.0	+13.4
Green	Katherine Ellen Prendergast	276	25.9	−4.9
Liberal Democrats	Henry Nicholas John Samuels	217	20.4	+2.8
Conservative	Alexander James Curtis	111	10.4	−9.7
Monster Raving Loony	Alasdair Iain de Voil (Mad Hatter)	13	1.2	−1.7
Turnout		1064	37.4	
Labour hold				

=== Churchill ===
Party	Candidate	Votes	%	±%
Labour	Mark Lygo	761	67.9	+15.7
Conservative	John Allan Selway	144	12.9	+2.8
Green	Kevin Nicholas McGlynn	130	11.6	−2.5
Liberal Democrats	Peter Charles Coggins	85	7.6	−0.6
Turnout		1120	27	
Labour hold				

=== Cowley ===
Party	Candidate	Votes	%	±%
Labour	David Henwood	883	56.0	+15.5
Green	Hazel Frances Dawe	420	26.6	+10.1
Conservative	Gary William Dixon	210	13.3	+1.9
Liberal Democrats	Claire Elizabeth Murray	64	4.1	−4.6
Turnout		1577	35.4	
Labour hold				

=== Cowley Marsh ===
Party	Candidate	Votes	%	±%
Labour	Sajjad-Hussain Malik	932	54.8	+8.9
Green	Steven Mark Dawe	307	18.0	−6.1
Independent	Judith Anne Harley	252	14.8	+14.8
Liberal Democrats	Antony Edwin St John Brett	112	6.6	−1.1
Conservative	Liam Hatch	99	5.8	−16.8
Turnout		1702	38.5	
Labour hold				

=== Headington ===
Party	Candidate	Votes	%	±%
Liberal Democrats	Ruth Elaine Wilkinson	1100	59.7	+9.2
Labour	Marco Pontecorvi	437	23.7	−0.7
Conservative	Anthony Ian Gearing	172	9.3	−3.2
Green	Ann Alice Duncan	134	7.3	−2.4
Turnout		1843	44.7	
Liberal Democrats hold				

=== Headington Hill and Northway ===
Party	Candidate	Votes	%	±%
Labour	Nigel Chapman	776	51.7	+3.0
Conservative	Mark Bhagwandin	452	30.1	+0.7
Liberal Democrats	Maria Pereira Cabral de Azevedo e Bourbon	160	10.7	+3.0
Green	Oliver James Fairey	112	7.5	−5.1
Turnout		1500	42.4	
Labour hold				

=== Hinksey Park ===
Party	Candidate	Votes	%	±%
Labour	Marie Tidball	1273	67.5	+7.3
Green	Benjamin Raphael Carter	273	14.5	−4.9
Conservative	Siddharth Deva	199	10.6	+0.5
Liberal Democrats	Nicholas John Harding	140	7.4	+1.8
Turnout		1885	45.5	
Labour hold				

=== Holywell ===
Party	Candidate	Votes	%	±%
Labour	Daniel P. Iley-Williamson	451	40.9	+16.3
Liberal Democrats	Andy McKay	283	25.6	+14.0
Green	Fiona Kelly Joines	265	24.0	−21.1
Conservative	George Walker	105	9.5	−9.2
Turnout		1104	43.7	
Labour gain from Green		Swing	+18.7	

=== Iffley Fields ===
Party	Candidate	Votes	%	±%
Labour	Stephen John Curran	1015	47.5	+0.2
Green	Elise Danielle Benjamin	961	45.0	+1.6
Conservative	Simon James Bazley	94	4.4	−0.6
Liberal Democrats	Peter Patrick Bergamin	66	3.1	−1.1
Turnout		2136	53.9	
Labour gain from Green		Swing	+0.9	

=== Jericho and Osney ===
Party	Candidate	Votes	%	±%
Labour	Colin Cook	1007	52.6	−7.8
Green	Lois Knight Muddiman	508	26.5	+8.1
Liberal Democrats	Conor McKenzie	217	11.3	+0.2
Conservative	Jason John Richard Fiddaman	183	9.6	−0.6
Turnout		1915	43.2	
Labour hold				

=== Littlemore ===
Party	Candidate	Votes	%	±%
Labour	John Stuart Tanner	830	59.5	−5.9
Conservative	Daniel Stafford	284	20.4	−1.9
Green	Lucy Irene Fitchett Ayrton	205	14.7	+3.4
Liberal Democrats	Charles James Bidwell	75	5.4	+0.6
Turnout		1394	30	
Labour hold				

=== Lye Valley ===
Party	Candidate	Votes	%	±%
Labour	Patricia Kennedy	924	65.2	−13.4
Conservative	Johnson Mackline Kyeswa	216	15.2	−3.5
Green	Tim Peter Pizey	177	12.5	−9.6
Liberal Democrats	Mandy Machado	101	7.1	−0.2
Turnout		1418	29.4	
Labour hold				

=== Marston ===
Party	Candidate	Votes	%	±%
Independent	Michael Christopher Haines	1140	48.7	+48.7
Labour	Nicholas P. Walker	826	35.3	−18.3
Green	Miranda Shaw	112	4.8	−8.0
Conservative	Timothy Douglas Patmore	112	4.8	−10.2
Independent	Charles Michael Haynes	78	3.3	+3.3
Liberal Democrats	Alasdair James Murray	71	3.0	−5.5
Turnout		2339	51.8	
Independent hold				

=== North ===
Party	Candidate	Votes	%	±%
Labour	James Fry	796	51.3	+16.5
Liberal Democrats	Louis Joseph Simborowski Gill	403	26.0	−5.6
Conservative	Robert Vernon Porter	179	11.5	−3.8
Green	Claire Margaret El Mouden	174	11.2	−7.0
Turnout		1552	46.1	
Labour hold				

=== Northfield Brook ===
Party	Candidate	Votes	%	±%
Labour	Sian Taylor	573	70.1	−1.5
Conservative	Patricia Gwendoline Mary Jones	89	10.9	−0.6
Liberal Democrats	Rosemary Anne Beatrice Morlin	66	8.1	+2.5
Green	Robert James Henry Paynter	52	6.4	+4.9
TUSC	James Daniel Paul Morbin	37	4.5	+4.5
Turnout		817	18.6	
Labour hold				

=== Quarry and Risinghurst ===
Party	Candidate	Votes	%	±%
Labour	Chewe Edgar Munkonge	1003	44.7	+1.1
Liberal Democrats	Rosalind Claire Rogers	863	38.4	+13.0
Conservative	William Geoffrey Clare	230	10.2	−9.0
Green	Elizabeth Leonora Taylor	149	6.6	−5.1
Turnout		2245	47.8	
Labour hold				

=== Rose Hill and Iffley ===
Party	Candidate	Votes	%	±%
Labour	Edward Owen Turner	1187	69.3	+19.6
Conservative	Lilian Julia Sherwood	233	13.6	+5.6
Green	Janet Mary Wallis Hall	202	11.8	−2.3
Liberal Democrats	Ruven Ziegler	90	5.3	−7.4
Turnout		1712	37.3	
Labour hold				

=== St Clement's ===
Party	Candidate	Votes	%	±%
Labour	Jamila Begum Azad	726	50.3	−1.0
Green	Timothy John Robert Eden	413	28.6	−2.6
Liberal Democrats	Graham Roderick Jones	183	12.7	+4.0
Conservative	Charles Edward Daniel Gee	122	8.4	+1.2
Turnout		1444	37	
Labour hold				

=== St Margaret's ===
Party	Candidate	Votes	%	±%
Liberal Democrats	Thomas Landell Mills	592	37.8	+4.2
Labour	Catrin Roberts	396	25.3	−1.8
Conservative	Penelope Anne Lenon	338	21.6	−0.9
Green	Alastair James Johnnie Wilson	240	15.3	−1.5
Turnout		1566	46.3	
Liberal Democrats hold				

=== St Mary's ===
Party	Candidate	Votes	%	±%
Green	Craig Simmons	739	52.2	+3.2
Labour	Mohammed Azad	547	38.6	+2.2
Conservative	Dominic Heaney	71	5.0	−2.8
Liberal Democrats	Michael Harker Tait	59	4.2	−1.7
Turnout		1416	41.5	
Green hold				

=== Summertown ===
Party	Candidate	Votes	%	±%
Liberal Democrats	Andrew Gant	902	44.5	+2.9
Labour	Jane Marilyn Stockton	546	26.9	+9.9
Conservative	Graham Stanton Jones	350	17.2	−4.6
Green	Larry Sanders	231	11.4	−9.0
Turnout		2029	44.7	
Liberal Democrats hold				

=== Wolvercote ===
Party	Candidate	Votes	%	±%
Liberal Democrats	Angela Goff	944	45.2	+0.5
Conservative	Rosemary Newton Hilliard	623	29.8	−1.4
Green	Sarah Janet Edwards	284	13.6	+0.9
Labour	Hugh Michael Tappin	238	11.4	−0.1
Turnout		2089	47.5	
Liberal Democrats hold				

Source: "Election of City Councillors for the Wards of Summary of Results", Oxfordshire County Council, 28 June 2016.

== Party share of vote map ==
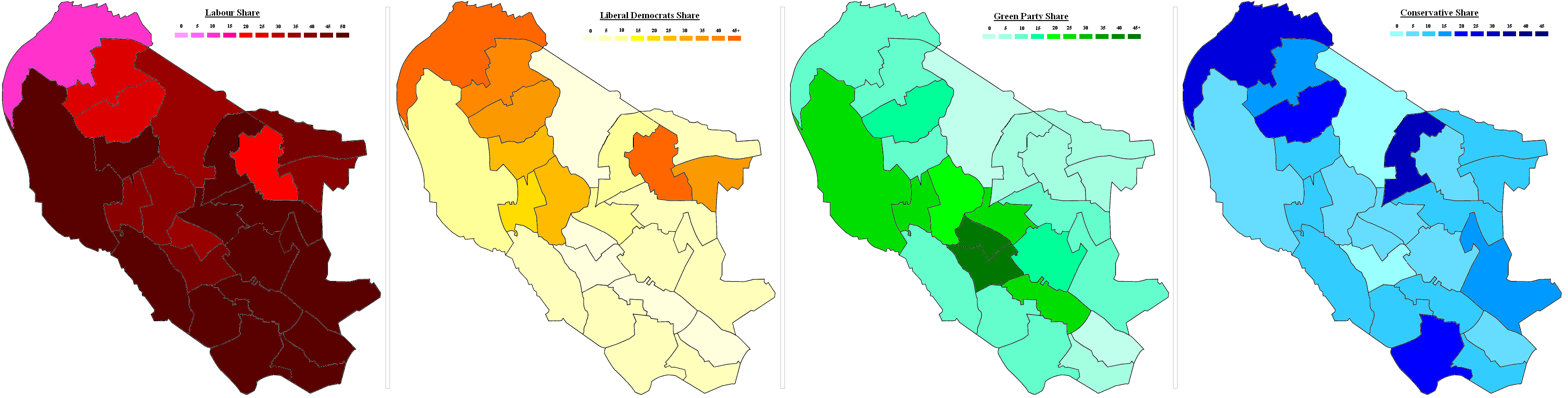
