= Katherine Willis, Baroness Willis of Summertown =

British ecologist (born 1964)

The Right Honourable The Baroness Willis of Summertown CBE FRS
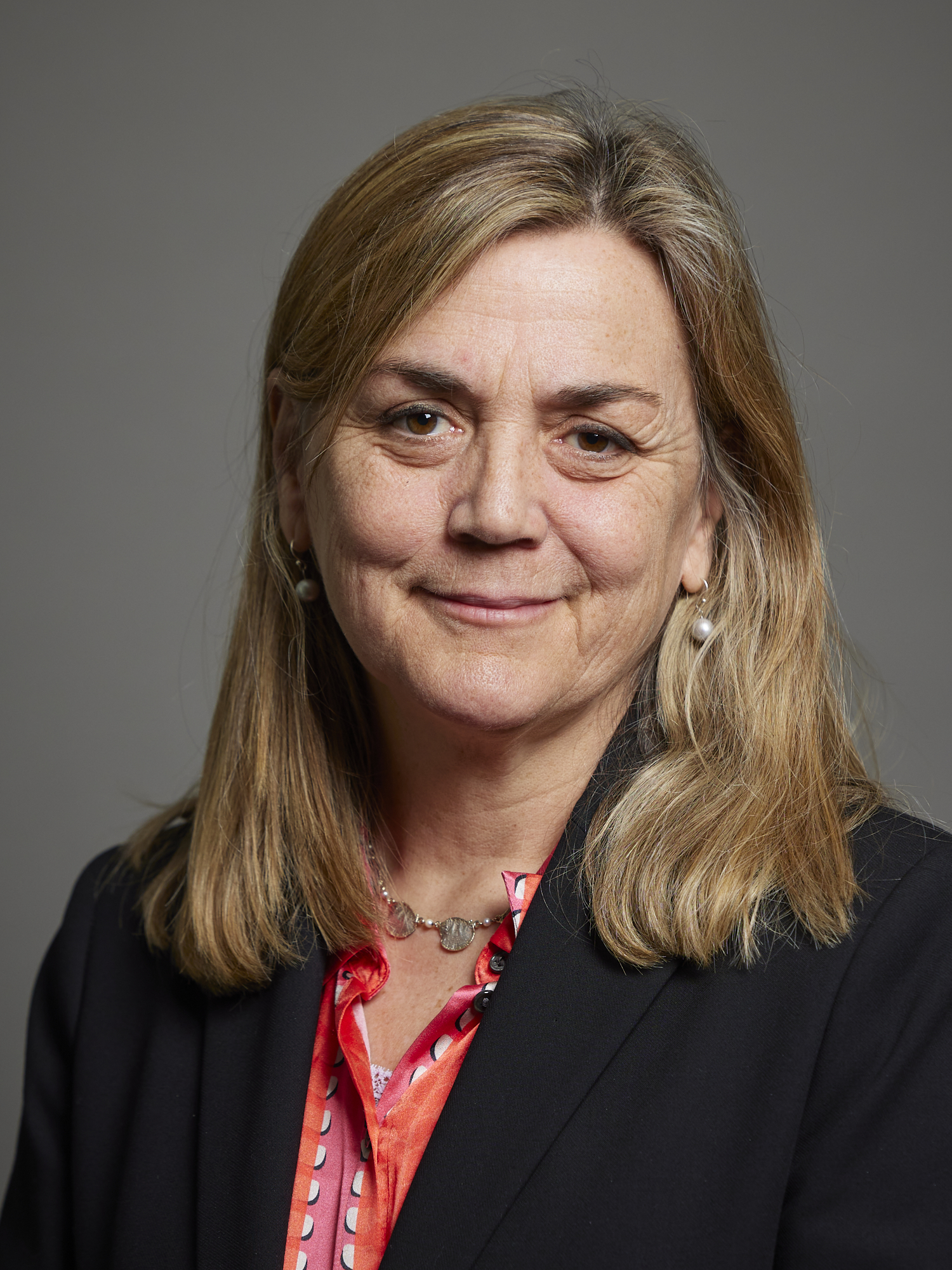
- Official portrait, 2024

Member of the House of Lords
- Lord Temporal
- Life peerage 8 July 2022

Personal details
- Born: Katherine Jane Willis; 16 January 1964 (age 62) London, England
- Party: Crossbench
- Spouse: Andrew Gant (m. 1992)
- Children: 3
- Scientific career
- Education: University of Southampton (BSc); University of Cambridge (PhD)
- Awards: Michael Faraday Prize (2015); Winner of Lyell Fund (2008)
- Fields: Ecology; Biodiversity; Conservation biology
- Workplaces: University of Cambridge; University of Oxford; University of Bergen; Royal Botanic Gardens, Kew
- Thesis: Late Quaternary vegetational history of Epirus, northwest Greece (1990)

Katherine Jane Willis, Baroness Willis of Summertown, CBE, FRS (born 16 January 1964) is a British biologist, academic and life peer, who studies the relationship between long-term ecosystem dynamics and environmental change. She is Professor of Biodiversity in the Department of Biology and Pro-Vice-Chancellor at the University of Oxford, and an adjunct professor in biology at the University of Bergen. In 2018 she was elected Principal of St Edmund Hall, and took up the position from 1 October. She held the Tasso Leventis Chair of Biodiversity at Oxford and was founding Director, now associate director, of the Biodiversity Institute Oxford. Willis was Director of Science at the Royal Botanic Gardens, Kew from 2013 to 2018. Her nomination by the House of Lords Appointments Commission as a crossbench life peer was announced on 17 May 2022. Willis was elected a Fellow of the Royal Society in May 2026.

== Early life and education ==
Katherine Jane Willis was born on 16 January 1964 in London to Edward George Willis and Winifred Ellen Willis (née Dymond). She gained an undergraduate degree in geography and environmental science from the University of Southampton, and a PhD in plant sciences from the University of Cambridge for research on the vegetational history of the late Quaternary period in Epirus, northwest Greece.

== Career and research ==
At the University of Cambridge, Willis held a postdoctoral research fellowship at Selwyn College, a Natural Environment Research Council (NERC) postdoctoral fellowship in the Department of Plant Sciences, and a Royal Society University Research Fellowship (URF) in the Godwin Institute for Quaternary Research. In 1999, she moved to a lectureship in the School of Geography and the Environment at the University of Oxford, where she established the Oxford Long-term Ecology Laboratory in 2002. Willis was made a professor of long-term ecology in 2008, and in October 2010 became the first Tasso Leventis Professor of Biodiversity and director of the James Martin Biodiversity Institute in Zoology. She was also an adjunct professor in the Department of Biology at the University of Bergen, Norway. She is a trustee of WWF-UK, a panel member on the advisory board for the Commonwealth Scholarship Commission, a trustee of the Percy Sladen Memorial Trust, an international member on the Swedish Research Council's FORMAS evaluation panel, and a college member of the UK Natural Environment Research Council (NERC). From 2012 to 2013 she held the elected position of director-at-large of the International Biogeography Society. In 2013, she was appointed Director of Science at the Royal Botanic Gardens, Kew, on a 5-year secondment from the University of Oxford. On 1 October 2018, Willis succeeded Keith Gull as Principal of St Edmund Hall, Oxford.

Willis's research focuses on reconstructing long term responses of ecosystems to environmental change, including climate change, human impact and sea level rise. She argues that understanding long-term records of ecosystem change is essential for a proper understanding of future ecosystem responses. Many scientific studies are limited to short-term datasets that rarely span more than 40 to 50 years, although many larger organisms, including trees and large mammals, have an average generation time which exceeds this timescale. Short-term records therefore are unable to reconstruct natural variability over time, or the rates of migration as a result of environmental change. She also argues that a short-term approach gives a static view of ecosystems, and leads to the conceptual formation of an unrealistic "norm" which must be maintained or restored and protected. Her research group in the Oxford Long-term Ecology laboratory therefore attempts to reconstruct ecosystem responses to environmental change on timescales ranging from tens to millions of years, and the applications of long-term records in biodiversity conservation. She has argued that the impacts of contemporary climate change on plant biota is uncertain and potentially not as severe as researchers envision, and challenged assumptions made in the interpretation of spatially constrained temperature records. Kew's State of the World's Plants report (2016) pinpoints land cover change as the major threat to global biodiversity, not climate change.

Willis's research has been published in Nature, Science, Philosophical Transactions of the Royal Society B, Biological Conservation. and Quaternary Science Reviews. With Jennifer McElwain she co-authored the textbook The Evolution of Plants. Her research has been funded by the Natural Environment Research Council (NERC) and the Arts and Humanities Research Council (AHRC).

== House of Lords ==
She was nominated as a life peer by the House of Lords Appointments Commission on 17 May 2022. She was created Baroness Willis of Summertown on 8 July 2022. Hers was the last peerage created by Elizabeth II. She made her maiden speech on 8 September 2022 during a debate on Climate Change and Biodiversity: Food Security. She sits as a non-party-political crossbench peer.

== Personal life ==
Willis married Andrew Gant, a composer and Liberal Democrat politician, in 1992. They have two sons and a daughter.

== Awards and honours ==
- Royal Society University Research Fellowship (URF)
- The Lyell Fund, Geological Society of London in 2008
- Elected a fellow of the Geological Society of London (FGS) in 2009
- Elected foreign member of the Norwegian Academy of Science and Letters
- Awarded the Michael Faraday Prize by the Royal Society, 2015
- Honorary doctorate, University of Bergen, 2017.
- Appointed Commander of the Most Excellent Order of the British Empire (CBE) in the 2018 Birthday Honours
- Elected a Fellow of the Royal Society in 2026.
