= Oxford University Student Union =

Organisation

Oxford SU
- Institution: University of Oxford
- Location: Jobcentre Plus, Oxford, OX1 2BX
- Established: 1961 (as OUSRC); 1974 (as OUSU)
- Sabbatical officers: President for Communities and Common Rooms: Shermar Pryce; President for Undergraduates: Seun Sowunmi; President for Postgraduates: Wantoe Wantoe; President for Welfare, Equity & Inclusion: Alisa Brown
- Affiliations: National Union of Students; Aldwych Group
- Website: oxfordsu.org

The Oxford University Student Union is the official students' union of the University of Oxford. It is better known in Oxford under the branding Oxford SU or by its previous name of OUSU. It exists to represent Oxford University students in the university's decision-making, to act as the voice for students in the national higher education policy debate, and to provide direct services to the student body.

== Early history ==
In 1961, the University of Oxford Proctors banned the student magazine Isis from publishing reviews of lectures. Students resisted, and legally incorporated the Oxford University Student Representative Council (OUSRC) for the first time. They then agitated for formal university recognition of the OUSRC, and petitioned the United Kingdom's Privy Council, asking the government to amend the Universities of Oxford and Cambridge Act 1859. Rather than risk having its hand forced by legislation, the university relented, and formally recognised the OUSRC in 1970.

The OUSRC adopted its contemporary constitution in 1974, changing its name to the Oxford University Student Union, or OUSU. OUSU rebranded itself as Oxford SU in 2017 to improve its image among students at Oxford.

== Structure ==
=== Membership ===
Membership at the Oxford University Student Union (Oxford SU) reflects the university's collegiate structure, operating on two interconnected levels: individual student membership and a federal body of common rooms.

All students are automatically enrolled as full members of Oxford SU, granting them the right to participate in all SU democratic processes, including elections and the Conference of Common Rooms. Any student may choose to opt out of their SU membership at any time.

The SU's federal nature is embodied by the Conference of Common Rooms (CCR), which serves as the primary democratic forum for the university's Junior Common Rooms (JCRs) and Middle Common Rooms (MCRs). Each common room holds membership in the Conference and sends a nominated representative to vote on its behalf. A common room can democratically decide to disaffiliate from the CCR. Such a decision does not affect the individual SU membership of that college's students, who retain their personal membership rights unless they opt out individually.

=== Finances ===
Oxford SU manages several commercial activities. Its most prominent event is the annual Freshers' Fair, a multi-day event held at the start of the academic year in the Examination Schools, which introduces new students to the university's many clubs and societies. The SU also engages in publishing, such as student handbooks.

Historically, the SU published The Oxford Student newspaper. However, as of Michaelmas 2025, the newspaper will transition to become an independent publication, with the SU providing financial support during its first year of independence. The SU also supports Oxide Radio, an editorially independent student radio station that broadcasts online.

=== Governance ===
Historically, Oxford SU was led by an executive committee of six full-time, salaried sabbatical officers. The sovereign body of the Student Union was the Oxford SU Council, a large assembly of over 150 voting members which included SU executive officers, divisional representatives, and multiple representatives from each affiliated JCR and MCR, as well as representatives from liberation campaigns. This structure underwent significant changes following a governance review initiated in the 2021/22 academic year. This review, combined with a subsequent "transformation period" in 2024 aimed at addressing structural and financial challenges, reshaped the SU's governance.

A primary outcome of this transformation was the replacement of the SU Council with a new primary democratic body, the Conference of Common Rooms (CCR). The transformation also whittled down the number of salaried officers. The previous six sabbatical roles were abolished and replaced with a new "flat" leadership structure of four "Major Office Holders" who serve as Sabbatical Officer Trustees. As of the 2025-26 academic year, these four roles are:

- President for Communities and Common Rooms
- President for Undergraduates
- President for Postgraduates
- President for Welfare, Equity & Inclusion

=== Campaigns and Representation ===
Under its new governance structure, Oxford SU's campaigns are organised into a single category known as Representative Committees (RepComs). These RepComs are official forums designed for specific student communities to deal with matters of shared interest, gather the views of students within that community, and provide student-led direction for the SU's work.

While RepComs can submit motions to the Conference of Common Rooms (CCR), they do not have a direct vote in the CCR itself. Any policy passed by a RepCom only becomes official SU-wide policy if it is also passed by the CCR. Each RepCom is chaired by a relevant part-time Equity Officer.

As of June 2025, the official Representative Committees are:

- Class RepCom
- Disabled Students' RepCom
- LGBTQ+ RepCom
- International Students' RepCom
- Black and Ethnic Minorities Student RepCom
- Suspended Students' RepCom
- Women*s RepCom

== Protests and occupations ==
Shortly before the formation of OUSU in 1974, agitation commenced within certain sections of the student body for a Central Students Union building by the Student Representative Council, forerunner of OUSU. The university feared that the existence of such facilities would be used for the promotion of student activism. In 1972, during the miners strike, students had offered their rooms to miners picketing Didcot Power Station and had supported staff who went on strike at St Anne's College.

On 5 November 1973, an open meeting called for direct action against the university on the issue of a Central Students Union building. Later that day students marched to the Examination Schools and commenced a sit in, which lasted seven days. The University Registrar sent an open letter to all Junior Members threatening proceedings in the High Court and disciplinary action against those who could be identified. The occupation was ended by students themselves after the university obtained a writ of possession.

OUSU was recognised by the university in early January 1974, and a meeting was held on 29 January with the Vice-Chancellor and others. The Vice-Chancellor made it clear that the university was facing deep cuts and there was no money for a CSU project.

The university was expecting a second occupation and contingency plans were drawn up. The Bursar of St John's College wrote to the President of the Junior Common Room on 11 February noting, "all the talk that is going on at the present time about occupation", and stating that in future the Bursary would be kept locked. It was reported that over £9,000 worth of damage had been done to the Examination Schools during the occupation the previous November. On 7 February an Extraordinary OUSU Council Meeting was held. Sue Lukes, David Aaronovitch and others attempted to defeat a motion stating that it was the position of OUSU not to support any occupation of university premises in furtherance of the CSU campaign. When this motion was put, Lukes and Aaronovitch resigned, the former making a speech condemning Council.

The following day, an anonymous flyer was circulated, headed 'Remember 5 November', it gave warning to the university that "You have had three months and your time is up. Negotiations have failed, talking has failed, OUSU has failed. Come to the Open Meeting on Monday night in the Union Hall. And don't forget your sleeping bag!"

At 9.15 am on Wednesday 13 February approximately 50 or 60 students entered the Indian Institute building in Catte Street shouting that they were occupying it and demanding that the people working there should leave. The 22 staff inside stayed at their desks while the students milled around after first closing the doors. What happened next was the subject of bitter dispute. The university claimed that at around 11.30 am, about 50 volunteers, 'relatively elderly gentlemen' working in the Clarendon Building decided out of concern for their colleagues to enter the building. A secretary let them in through a rear window, and once inside they confronted the intruders, who left in groups through the front door. The spokesman for the university insisted there was no violence, though it was conceded that there was some scrummaging and, 'ears may have been twisted'.

Those supporting the occupiers claimed that the university had set the Oxford University Police upon them who, goaded on by the Proctors, perpetrated acts of violence against the students, and encouraged the police, who were outside, to wade in also. The supporters of the occupiers asserted it was a 'pre-planned and ugly piece of violence'. It was alleged that at least one of the 'relatively elderly gentlemen' was in fact a serving police officer out of uniform, who was identified at a subsequent demonstration.

The university identified those it believed to have been the ringleaders and moved swiftly against them. Eighteen students were charged with an offence under the University Statutes and were required to attend at the Proctor's Office in cap and gown on 21 February under threat of being rusticated if they did not appear. The eighteen included Sue Lukes and another student from Somerville College, three from Magdalen and two each from Pembroke, St John's and Balliol. They were committed for trial at a Disciplinary Court on 11 March, during the Easter vacation. The chairman of the Court was Barry Nicholas, a Professor of Comparative Law. All who attended agreed that the trial was a travesty of justice. Mike Sullivan wrote an open letter describing how the Court decided every procedural point against the defendants; several were expelled for making objections, including Tariq Ali who was acting as a McKenzie friend to some of the defendants. Gordon Day, President of St John's Junior Common Room reported that even Andrew Turek, an ex-President of the university Monday Club and a virulent supporter of disciplinary action being taken against those who occupied University buildings, described the proceedings as a 'farce' and labelled the University Marshall, Mr Skinner, as 'a maniac who should not be allowed on University property'.

On the testimony, mainly, of a University Police Officer, Philip Berry, all of the defendants were convicted of being present at the occupation. It was admitted in Court that the Proctors were present together with other 'employees' of the university and an 'independent contractor' with two of his men. It was conceded that the 'occupation' amounted to nothing more than possession of the stairs and corridors and no violence was at any time offered to University staff. Nevertheless, the eighteen defendants were all sent down with the sentence suspended for one year. A subsequent appeal by thirteen of the defendants failed.

The CSU campaign continued with declining support through the latter half of the 1970s.

=== 1980s: No Platform Referendum ===
A major upset occurred in the 1981 elections, when an Independent group of ex-JCR Presidents from apolitical colleges banded together as the 'Bernadistas', and won an overall majority. Alan Hughes of Trinity (known as 'Bernard' because of his resemblance to Bernard Levin) was the President, and Jervis Smith of Queen's served as the other sabbatical officer. In December 1985 OUSU adopted a No Platform policy following a controversial invitation to Patrick Harrington to speak at the Brasenose Debating Society. The Oxford University Conservative Association organised a petition of almost 700 signatures, more than the minimum requirement, to put the policy to a referendum of the student union's members. In late February 1986, the No Platform policy was overturned by a vote of 3,152 against with 2,246 in favour.

=== Protests and occupations 1990s to date ===
Several student groups participated in protests against the introduction of tuition fees from 1998 onwards, with Oxford students playing a major role in the nationwide Campaign for Free Education. Activities included non-payment campaigns, the occupation of Exam Schools in 1998 and of the Development Office in November 1999, several marches and a short-lived blockade of the University Offices. OUSU support for these protests was limited in 1998, but became more formal during the presidency of Anneliese Dodds (1999). Following another occupation of Exam Schools in January 2004, the university pursued disciplinary action against five OUSU sabbatical officers.

In 2001 and 2007, OUSU led protests against speakers at the Oxford Union. In 2001, Kirsty McNeill led a successful protest to stop the visit of Holocaust denier David Irving to the debating society. In 2007, the Oxford Union attracted condemnation again for inviting Irving and BNP leader Nick Griffin to speak at a "free speech forum". The then OUSU President, Martin McCluskey, led a campaign against the visits which attracted attention and support from national anti-fascist organisations, politicians and media commentators.

Oxford SU has also been mentioned in a Governmental enquiry of freedom of speech in universities due to one of its liberation campaigns disrupting a talk at St John's College organised by a student anti-abortion rights group on abortion in Ireland. A protest started shortly after one of the organisers introduced the speakers and involved chants such as "Pro-life, that's a lie, you don't care if women die". The police were called after one of the protesters got into a minor altercation with a security guard, although no arrests were made and the talk eventually started after 40 minutes.

Both the SU and the anti-abortion rights group later issued statements about the event with the SU stating that "We do not believe that the speakers invited should be hosted without challenge. We were not protesting Oxford Students for Life or their speakers' right to free speech" and also that "bodily autonomy is not up for debate". The anti-abortion rights group called this "a deliberate attempt to shut down discussion and dialogue through harassment and bullying" and later issued a second statement accusing the SU of breaking the law. One of the speakers later wrote an article for the Irish Times on her experiences of the event.

The SU voted on 10 February 2018 to support Oxford university staff's strike action against proposed changes to the University Superannuation Scheme (USS). Oxford University staff union members voted to join 60 other universities in the national strike action, coordinated by the University and College Union (UCU) after a breakdown in its negotiations with the university employers' representative, Universities UK (UUK), over UUK's proposals to remove the defined benefit element of the USS pension scheme.

Student groups affiliated with the SU have led repeated environmental protests in recent years at the University of Oxford. In 2017, the Paradise Papers showed large Oxford and Cambridge Universities' investments in fossil fuels, prompting student union action, including Cambridge Zero Carbon Society and the Oxford Climate Justice Campaign (an OUSU Environment & Ethics campaign) disrupting the annual Oxford-Cambridge boat race, and the OCJC occupation of St John's College, Oxford, to protest its investments in large multinational fossil fuel companies like BP and Shell. In 2021, the Climate League of Oxford and Cambridge was created to lobby colleges for transparency around climate info.

== Controversies ==
=== Rashmi Samant ===
In 2021, Rashmi Samant, pursuing MSc in Energy Systems at Linacre College, became the first Indian president-elect of Oxford SU. Shortly, several Oxford societies condemned her social media posts for displaying racially insensitive, anti-Semitic, and transphobic sentiments and asked her to resign; Samant apologised, and, facing multiple successful no-confidence motions at individual colleges, did resign.

Afterwards, Abhijit Sarkar, a postdoctoral scholar of history of S. Asia at New College, who has a history of social media outbursts posted a photo of Samant's parents framed with the slogan of Jai Shri Ram that has been used in India, as a nationalistic war-cry. Sarkar also claimed Samant's alumna institution in India to be a hotbed of Islamophobic far-right forces. Samant has since alleged that she was "cyber-lynched" into resigning, and that her critics were motivated by racism. The Hindu Nationalist Bharatiya Janata Party demanded that the university probe into the anti-Hindu atmosphere; Indian Minister of External Affairs S. Jaishankar supported Samant and even promised to raise the issue with his British counterparts, if required.

The Oxford Hindu, Indian, and South Asian societies dismissed Samant's allegations as part of a "misleading narrative", that fed into the "fundamentally exclusionary and discriminatory" nature of Hindutva. An Indian-origin Hindu student went on to win the by-election.

=== Danial Hussain ===
In 2023, the Oxford Student reported that the current president, Danial Hussain, was suspended after allegedly exposing SU staff to gay pornography via Google Drive, as well as revealing that the President had previously been suspended earlier that year over allegations of serious misconduct. Hussain downplayed the allegations, claiming he was a victim of a "prank" by his friends. This followed earlier calls for impeachment after allegations that the President 'lied' about consulting students over rule changes to the SU's Student Council. Hussain was later reinstated to the role after 4 months, with the SU refusing to "comment on confidential HR matters". In October 2024, after Hussain's term had ended, Oxford SU issued a formal public apology to him. The SU apologised for its handling of two separate issues during his presidency, acknowledging the negative impact the events had on him.

== List of former presidents ==
- 1971 – Emily Wallace (Somerville) was elected OUSRC president, the first president of Oxford students to be officially recognised by the university.
- 1982 – John Grogan became the first president to succeed in obtaining a seat for students at the university's governing council, in June 1983. He and two other students chosen by OUSU became observers for most of the council's agenda, and this practice was enshrined in the university's Statutes, Decrees, and Regulations.
- 1985-86 – Matthew Taylor, subsequently became a Liberal Party Member of Parliament and Member of the House of Lords.
- 1986-87 – Mark Stephens.
- 1993 – Akaash Maharaj (St Edmund Hall) became the first ever visible ethnic minority president and also the first president from overseas (Canada). He helped lead a successful national campaign that thwarted a 1994 government bill to restrict the ability of students' unions to comment on public policy issues and that contributed to the ultimate dismissal from Cabinet of the then Secretary of State for Education, John Patten.
- 2000/01 – Kirsty McNeill (Balliol)
- 2001/02 – Anneliese Dodds (St Hilda's)
- 2003 – Will Straw (New) carried out protests against the government's introduction of tuition fees for students, despite his father Jack Straw being a senior member of the government of the day.
- 2007/08 – Martin McCluskey (St Hugh's)
- 2009/10 – Alan Strickland (Merton)
- 2010/11 – David Barclay (Worcester)
- 2011/12 – Martha Mackenzie (St John's)
- 2012/13 – David J. Townsend (St John's). The first postgraduate degree student to be elected president.
- 2013/14 – Tom Rutland (Jesus)
- 2014/15 – Louis Trup (Brasenose)
- 2016 – Becky Howe (Pembroke)
- 2017/18 – Kate Cole (Regent's Park)
- 2020 – Nikita Ma (Trinity) is the first East Asian president and the first president from Asia.
- 2020/21 – Rashmi Samant (Linacre) Elected but then resigned.
- 2021 – Anvee Bhutani (Magdalen) led the first all women of colour SU sabbatical officer team.
- 2023 – Danial Hussain (LMH). The first foundation year student to be elected president.
- 2024/25 – Addi Haran (Lincoln). The first trans person to be elected president.
  - Switch from 1 president to 4 presidents for Undergraduates, Postgraduates, Communities and common rooms, and welfare, equity and inclusion. Presidents after this change can be viewed in the section below.

== Sabbatical Officers ==
=== History of Sabbatical Officer Roles ===
Prior to 2023, Oxford SU was led by six sabbatical officers: President, VP for Access and Academic Affairs, VP Charities and Community, VP Welfare and Equal Opportunities, VP Women, and VP Graduates.

A governance review instigated by President Anvee Bhutani (2021–22) led to a significant restructuring of these roles ahead of the 2023 elections. The review, which aimed to increase inclusion, amended the VP positions. Notably, the dedicated VP Women role was replaced with a broader VP for Liberation and Equalities, a move that drew criticism from the post-holder at the time.

This six-officer structure was itself replaced following a further "transformation period" in 2024, which was initiated to address financial and structural challenges. This second overhaul reduced the number of salaried officers from six to four and introduced a "flat" leadership model of "Major Office Holders", all with the title of “President” who are also Sabbatical Officer Trustees.

As of the 2025-26 academic year, the four Major Office Holder positions are:

- President for Communities and Common Rooms
- President for Undergraduates
- President for Postgraduates
- President for Welfare, Equity & Inclusion

Year	President for Communities and Common Rooms	President for Undergraduates	President for Postgraduates	President for Welfare, Equity & Inclusion
2025-26	Shermar Pryce	Seun Sowunmi	Wantoe Wantoe	Alisa Brown
2026-27	Roxana Rusu	Zagham Farhan	David Quan	Catherine Kola-Balogun
