= Andrew Gant =

British composer and politician (born 1963)

Andrew John Gant (born 6 August 1963) is a British composer, singer, author, teacher and Liberal Democrat politician. He was organist, choirmaster and composer at Her Majesty's Chapel Royal from 2000 to 2013, and has published several books on musical subjects.

Gant serves as a Liberal Democrat Councillor on both Oxford City Council and Oxfordshire County Council. He was the party's parliamentary candidate for The Cotswolds constituency at the 2017 general election and for the Staffordshire Moorlands constituency at the 2019 general election. In 2022 he was elected to the Cabinet of Oxfordshire County Council with the Highways Management portfolio.

He is the husband of Katherine Willis, Baroness Willis of Summertown.

== Education ==
Gant attended Radley College before going on to read music and English at St John's College, Cambridge. He was a choral scholar and sang in the college choir under George Guest. He subsequently studied composition with Paul Patterson at the Royal Academy of Music and completed his PhD at Goldsmiths College, University of London.

== Musical career ==
Gant is Stipendiary Lecturer in Music at St Peter's College, Oxford, and held the same position at St Edmund Hall, Oxford, until 2014. In his early career he sang tenor with most of the United Kingdom's leading choirs and vocal ensembles, including The Sixteen, the Monteverdi Choir, the Cambridge Singers, the Tallis Scholars, and the six-man vocal sextet The Light Blues, with whom he toured and performed in the US, Africa, Israel and across Europe. He has held posts as a church musician at Westminster Abbey, Selwyn College, Cambridge, the Royal Military Chapel (the Guards' Chapel) and Worcester College, Oxford. In September 2000 he was appointed organist, choirmaster and composer at Her Majesty's Chapels Royal and held the post until August 2013. He led the Chapel Royal choir at, among many other events, the funeral of Queen Elizabeth the Queen Mother, the Golden Jubilee service at St Paul's Cathedral in 2002, the Diamond Jubiliee service in 2012 (also at St Paul's Cathedral), the tenth anniversary service for the death of Diana, Princess of Wales, the wedding of Prince William and Catherine Middleton in 2011, the annual Remembrance Day parade at the Cenotaph and the annual Royal Maundy service, in addition to the regular services held in the chapels of St James's Palace and Kensington Palace. The annual tradition of Christmas carols performed for the royal household in the ballroom of Buckingham Palace and broadcast on Classic FM began during his tenure.

His compositions include church music, solo works for singers including the late James Bowman, "The Vision of Piers Plowman", an oratorio for the 2002 Three Choirs Festival, "A British Symphony", premiered by the Philharmonia in 2007, "May we borrow your husband?" an a cappella opera, "Don't go down the Elephant after midnight", an opera for soprano Patricia Rozario, works for choir including the Christmas carols "What Child is This?" and "The Blessed Son of God", and arrangements such as "Still, Still, Still". His opera for young people, "Tod!", based on the life and work of Beatrix Potter, was commissioned by Cromarty Youth Opera and premiered by them, conducted by Edward Caswell, in August 2018.

== Writing career ==
Gant has appeared at literary festivals across the United Kingdom and further afield, as well as on national television and radio. His association with Profile Books began in 2013 and he is the author of several books on music:

- Christmas Carols: From Village Green to Church Choir (2014)
- O Sing Unto the Lord: A History of English Church Music (2015)
- Music: Ideas in Profile (2017)
- Johann Sebastian Bach: A Very Brief History (2018)
- The Making of Handel's Messiah (2020)
- Five Straight Lines: A History of Music (2021)

"Deck The Hall", investigating more traditional Christmas Carols, was published by Hodder Faith in October 2023.

== Political career ==
At the May 2014 Oxford City Council election, Gant was elected as Liberal Democrat councillor for the Summertown ward. He was re-elected at the May 2016 election and took over as leader of the Lib Dem group and leader of the opposition. He has served on a number of council committees, including as Chair of the Scrutiny Committee from May 2016 to May 2021. He also chaired the Scrutiny Panel of the Future Oxfordshire Partnership, a body comprising councillors from all six councils within Oxfordshire. He stood unsuccessfully for the parliamentary constituency of The Cotswolds at the 2017 general election. In December 2019 he was his party's candidate for the Staffordshire Moorlands constituency in the general election. In May 2021 he was re-elected to Oxford City Council for Cutteslowe and Sunnymead, a new ward following boundary changes, and was elected to Oxfordshire County Council to represent Wolvercote and Summertown division. In May 2022 he was elected to the Cabinet of the County Council, becoming Cabinet Member for Highways Management. At the same time he stood down as Leader of the Opposition and Leader of the Liberal Democrat group on Oxford City Council.

In 2023, freedom of information requests revealed the County Council had knowingly withheld unfavourable traffic modelling results, showing projected increases in traffic of up to 62% on parts of Woodstock Road, prior to consulting the public on Traffic Filters. The decision to install Traffic Filters led the Conservative leader of the opposition, Eddie Reeves, to accuse the council of a 'cover up' after the hidden modelling data was uncovered along with an email commitment to the Department of Transport the spring prior to consultation that the filters would go ahead.

Cllr Reeves called for Gant to resign in June 2023 after a Council report assessing the impact of the East Oxford ‘low traffic neighbourhood’ (LTN) policy, found the LTN could cause delays of up to 45 seconds to ambulances responding to Category 1 (life-threatening) emergency calls.

Cultural offices
Preceded by Richard Popplewell	Organist, Composer and Master of the Children of the Chapel Royal; 2000–2013	Succeeded by Huw Williams
