= 2014 Oxford City Council election =

2014 UK local government election

Results of the 2014 Oxford City Council election

The elections for Oxford City Council took place on Thursday 22 May 2014. As Oxford City Council is elected by halves, one seat in each of the 24 wards was up for election, apart from in Summertown ward where both seats were up for election following the resignation of Councillor Stuart McCready on 3 April 2014.

Overall turnout was 37%, up from 29.4% in 2012.

== Results summary ==
Results data from Oxford Council.

Oxford local election result 2014
Party	Seats	Gains	Losses	Net gain/loss	Seats %	Votes %	Votes	+/−
Labour	17	3	0	+3	68.0	41.2	17,541	-1.3
Liberal Democrats	5	0	4	-4	20.0	18.9	8,043	+0.4
Green	3	2	1	+1	12.0	20.2	8,599	-1.1
Conservative	0	0	0	0	0.0	15.7	6,709	+1.1
UKIP	0	0	0	0	0.0	2.9	1,228	+2.4
Independent	0	0	0	0	0.0	1.0	447	-1.6
Monster Raving Loony	0	0	0	0	0.0	0.1	45	+0.1

Note: six UKIP candidates stood in this election, compared with three in 2012 and one in 2010. One candidate stood for the Official Monster Raving Loony Party, compared with none in either 2010 or 2012. Four independent candidates were standing, compared with one each in 2012 and 2010. Plus/minus percentages are calculated with respect to the 2012 Oxford City Council election.

Total number of seats on the council after the election:

Party	Previous council	Staying councillors	Seats up for election	Election result	New council
Labour	30	16	14	17	33
Liberal Democrats	12	3	9	5	8
Green	5	3	2	3	6
Independent	1	1	0	0	1
Total	48	23	25	25	48

== Results by ward ==
Map of the Oxford Wards

Plus/minus percentages are calculated with respect to the 2010 Oxford City Council election.

=== Barton and Sandhills ===
Party	Candidate	Votes	%	±%
Labour	Van Coulter	773	50.8	+8.1
UKIP	Ian Macdonald	293	19.3	+19.3
Conservative	James Johnson	202	13.3	−9.5
Green	Raymond Hitchins	121	8.0	+1.5
Liberal Democrats	Sallie Barnard	105	6.9	−21.2
Independent	Benjamin Linus	28	1.8	+1.8
Turnout				
Labour hold		Swing		

=== Blackbird Leys ===
Party	Candidate	Votes	%	±%
Labour	Rae Humberstone	642	67.3	−2.2
UKIP	Dickie Bird	196	20.5	+20.5
Conservative	Vanessa Bhagwandin	54	5.7	−8.1
Green	Lizzie McHale	43	4.5	+0.2
Liberal Democrats	Mark Wheeler	19	2.0	−10.4
Turnout				
Labour hold		Swing		

=== Carfax ===
Party	Candidate	Votes	%	±%
Green	Ruthi Brandt	483	30.8	+9.2
Labour	Alex Hollingsworth	448	28.6	+8.2
Conservative	Maryam Ahmed	315	20.1	−0.3
Liberal Democrats	Tony Brett	276	17.6	−20.0
Monster Raving Loony	Mad Hatter	45	2.9	+2.9
Turnout		1567		
Green gain from Liberal Democrats		Swing		

=== Churchill ===
Party	Candidate	Votes	%	±%
Labour	Susan Brown	607	52.2	−8
UKIP	David Slater	179	15.4	+15
Green	Julian Faultless	164	14.1	−4
Conservative	Berk Bektas	117	10.1	−5
Liberal Democrats	James Reilly	95	8.2	+1
Turnout		1162		
Labour hold		Swing		

=== Cowley ===
Party	Candidate	Votes	%	±%
Labour	Christine Simm	659	40.5	−5.4
Independent	Chaka Artwell	373	22.9	+22.9
Green	Clare Cochrane	268	16.5	+2.5
Conservative	Gary Dixon	186	11.4	−7.0
Liberal Democrats	Imtiaz Gulzar	142	8.7	−13.1
Turnout		1628		
Labour hold		Swing		

=== Cowley Marsh ===
Party	Candidate	Votes	%	±%
Labour	Mohammed Abbasi	793	45.5	+5.7
Green	Richard Scrase	420	24.1	+9.4
Conservative	Judith Harley	394	22.6	−6.3
Liberal Democrats	Catherine Hodgkinson	135	7.7	−8.8
Turnout		1742		
Labour hold		Swing		

=== Headington ===
Party	Candidate	Votes	%	±%
Liberal Democrats	Mohammed Altaf-Khan	946	50.5	+5.9
Labour	David Henwood	514	27.4	+1.2
Conservative	Theodora Dickinson	234	12.5	−7.2
Green	David Haycock	181	9.7	+0.2
Turnout		1875		
Liberal Democrats hold		Swing		

=== Headington Hill and Northway ===
Party	Candidate	Votes	%	±%
Labour	Farida Anwar	719	48.7	+19.7
Conservative	Mark Bhagwandin	433	29.4	+8.8
Green	Ruth Bamber	186	12.6	+4.0
Liberal Democrats	Maria Bourbon	113	7.7	−34.0
Independent	Nicholas Fell	24	1.6	+1.6
Turnout		1475		
Labour gain from Liberal Democrats		Swing		

Note: Nicholas Fell was originally intending to stand for UKIP, but then was not nominated in time.

=== Hinksey Park ===
Party	Candidate	Votes	%	±%
Labour	Bob Price	1158	60.2	+11.3
Green	Judy Chipchase	373	19.4	+6.1
Conservative	Simon Mort	195	10.1	−5.9
Liberal Democrats	Andrew Tope	108	5.6	−16.2
UKIP	Stuart O'Reilly	88	4.6	+4.6
Turnout		1922		
Labour hold		Swing		

=== Holywell ===
Party	Candidate	Votes	%	±%
Green	David Thomas	675	45.1	+22.6
Labour	Aled Jones	369	24.6	+7.2
Conservative	Poppy Stokes	280	18.7	−2.5
Liberal Democrats	Jean Vila	174	11.6	−27.3
Turnout		1498		
Green gain from Liberal Democrats		Swing		

=== Iffley Fields ===
Party	Candidate	Votes	%	±%
Labour	Richard Tarver	986	47.3	+17.0
Green	Steve Dawe	904	43.4	+6.2
Conservative	Neil Prestidge	105	5.0	−4.8
Liberal Democrats	Simon Bearder	88	4.2	−18.5
Turnout		2083		
Labour gain from Green		Swing		

=== Jericho and Osney ===
Party	Candidate	Votes	%	±%
Labour	Susanna Pressel	1313	60.4	+6.0
Green	Sarah Pethybridge	399	18.4	−3.6
Liberal Democrats	Conor McKenzie	241	11.1	+1.4
Conservative	John Walsh	221	10.2	−2.7
Turnout		2174		
Labour hold		Swing	+7.8	

=== Littlemore ===
Party	Candidate	Votes	%	±%
Labour	Gill Sanders	762	53.6	+5.8
Conservative	Daniel Stafford	317	22.3	+0.8
Green	Alyson Duckmanton	257	18.1	+11.1
Liberal Democrats	John McCann	85	6.0	−17.6
Turnout		1421		
Labour hold		Swing		

=== Lye Valley ===
Party	Candidate	Votes	%	±%
Labour	Ben Lloyd-Shogbesan	728	51.8	+6.9
Green	Steve Woolliams	311	22.1	+12.7
Conservative	Paul Hernandez	263	18.7	−3.3
Liberal Democrats	Penny Yewers	103	7.3	−16.4
Turnout		1405		
Labour hold		Swing		

=== Marston ===
Party	Candidate	Votes	%	±%
Labour	Mary Clarkson	1064	53.6	+14.7
Conservative	Duncan Hatfield	297	15.0	+0.9
Green	Alistair Morris	254	12.8	+4.6
UKIP	Jonathan Miller	201	10.1	+10.1
Liberal Democrats	Salman Navqi	169	8.5	−10.2
Turnout		1985		
Labour hold		Swing		

=== North ===
Party	Candidate	Votes	%	±%
Labour	Louise Upton	723	34.8	+0.1
Liberal Democrats	Tim Bearder	657	31.6	+0.4
Green	Sushila Dhall	379	18.2	−6.3
Conservative	Penelope Lenon	318	15.3	+5.9
Turnout		2077		
Labour hold		Swing		

Note: gain/hold and percentage change calculated with respect to the by-election of 19 September 2013. In 2010, the seat was won by the Liberal Democrats.

=== Northfield Brook ===
Party	Candidate	Votes	%	±%
Labour	Scott Seamons	700	71.6	
Conservative	Pat Jones	112	11.5	
Green	Robert Paynter	111	11.3	
Liberal Democrats	Rachel Fielder	55	5.6	
Turnout		978		
Labour hold		Swing		

=== Quarry and Risinghurst ===
Party	Candidate	Votes	%	±%
Labour	Dee Sinclair	941	43.6	
Liberal Democrats	Roz Smith	549	25.4	
Conservative	Katharine Harborne	415	19.2	
Green	Liz Taylor	253	11.7	
Turnout		2158		
Labour hold		Swing		

=== Rose Hill and Iffley ===
Party	Candidate	Votes	%	±%
Labour	Michele Paule	873	49.7	
UKIP	Paddy Graham	271	15.4	
Green	Paul Skinner	248	14.1	
Liberal Democrats	Faisal Aziz	223	12.7	
Conservative	Lilian Sherwood	140	8.0	
Turnout		1755		
Labour hold		Swing		

=== St Clement's ===
Party	Candidate	Votes	%	±%
Labour	Tom Hayes	875	51.3	
Green	Hazel Dawe	532	31.2	
Liberal Democrats	Graham Jones	148	8.7	
Conservative	Siddharth Deva	129	7.6	
Independent	Pat Mylvaganam	22	1.3	
Turnout		1706		
Labour gain from Liberal Democrats		Swing		

=== St Margaret's ===
Party	Candidate	Votes	%	±%
Liberal Democrats	Liz Wade	610	33.6	
Labour	Nigel Chapman	492	27.1	
Conservative	Vernon Porter	409	22.5	
Green	Ann Duncan	305	16.8	
Turnout		1816		
Liberal Democrats hold		Swing		

=== St Mary's ===
Party	Candidate	Votes	%	±%
Green	Dick Wolff	733	49.4	
Labour	Sian Taylor	546	36.8	
Conservative	Theodore Heren	116	7.8	
Liberal Democrats	Ian Bearder	88	5.9	
Turnout		1483		
Green hold		Swing		

=== Summertown ===
Party	Candidate	Votes	%	±%
Liberal Democrats	Jean Fooks	1100	54.3	
Liberal Democrats	Andrew Gant	843	41.6	
Conservative	Kenneth Bickers	441	21.8	
Green	Sarah Edwards	413	20.4	
Labour	Bob Colenutt	344	17.0	
Conservative	Arjun Sinsinwar	339	16.7	
Green	Oliver Tickell	311	15.3	
Labour	Eleanor Law	262	12.9	
Turnout		2027		
Liberal Democrats hold		Swing		
Liberal Democrats hold		Swing		

=== Wolvercote ===
Party	Candidate	Votes	%	±%
Liberal Democrats	Steve Goddard	971	44.7	
Conservative	Tom Williams	677	31.2	
Green	Lee Crawfurd	275	12.7	
Labour	Michael Taylor	250	11.5	
Turnout		2173		
Liberal Democrats hold		Swing		

== Party share of vote map ==
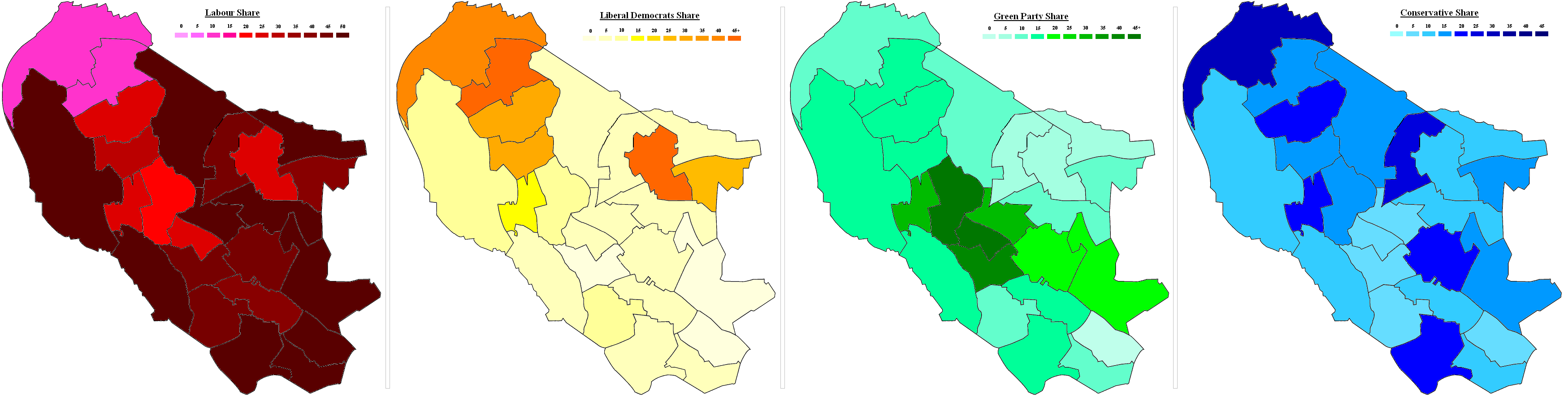

== See also ==
- Elections in the United Kingdom
