= Lawrence La Fountain-Stokes =

Puerto Rican author, scholar, and performer

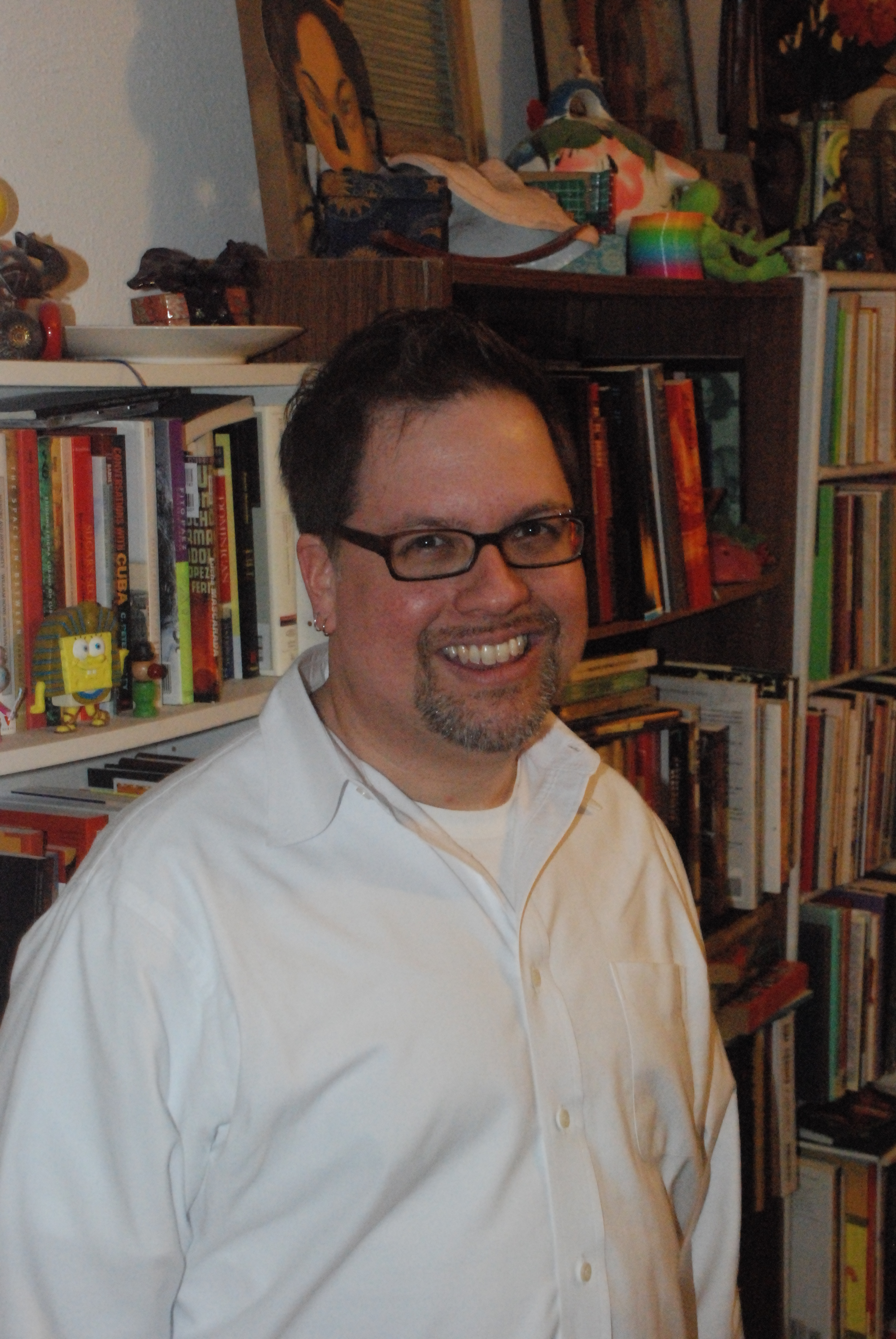
- Lawrence La Fountain-Stokes, 2009
- Born: April 10, 1968 (age 58); San Juan, Puerto Rico
- Occupations: Short story writer, poet, playwright, scholar
- Writing career
- Notable works: Uñas pintadas de azul/Blue Fingernails; Queer Ricans
- Notable awards: Pregones Asunción Playwrights Award
- Website: www-personal.umich.edu/~lawrlafo

Lawrence La Fountain-Stokes (born April 10, 1968) is a gay Puerto Rican author, scholar, and performer. He is better known as Larry La Fountain. He has received several awards for his creative writing and scholarship as well as for his work with Latino and lesbian, gay, bisexual, and transgender (LGBTQ) students. He currently resides in Ann Arbor, Michigan.

== Life ==
La Fountain-Stokes was born and raised in San Juan, Puerto Rico, specifically in Miramar, a traditional neighborhood located in the central district of Santurce. He was adopted at birth by Donald and Ramona La Fountain, and is the brother of the ESPN newscaster Michele La Fountain. He has written about his childhood experiences in an essay called "Los nenes con los nenes y las nenas con las nenas" [Girls with Girls, and Boys with Boys], where he describes his childhood home as bilingual and bicultural, as he was raised speaking English and Spanish. His essay "Queer Diasporas, Boricua Lives: A Meditation on Sexile" also discusses some of these early experiences.

La Fountain-Stokes received all of his primary and secondary education at the Academia del Perpetuo Socorro, an elite bilingual school run by the School Sisters of Notre Dame. He graduated from high school in 1986. He then studied at Harvard College in Cambridge, Massachusetts, where he received his Bachelor of Arts degree in Hispanic Studies in 1991. While in college, La Fountain-Stokes spent a year and a half studying at the University of São Paulo in Brazil. He later went on to obtain a master's degree and Doctorate in Spanish from Columbia University in New York City.

La Fountain-Stokes started his teaching career as an assistant professor at the Ohio State University (1998–1999) and then taught at Rutgers, The State University of New Jersey for four years (1999–2003). Since 2003, he has taught Latino studies, American studies, and Spanish at the University of Michigan, including courses on queer Hispanic Caribbean culture, LGBT studies and Latino literature, theater, performance, and film. He was promoted to associate professor with tenure in 2009 and to professor in 2019. His interviews in Spanish with leading Latino artists, journalists, and scholars such as the Uruguayan novelist and pop singer Dani Umpi and the Los Angeles Times journalist Sam Quiñones appear on the "University of Michigan in Spanish" channel on YouTube and on iTunes U.

== Scholarly works ==
La Fountain-Stokes's academic writing has focused mostly on queer Puerto Rican culture. His book Queer Ricans: Cultures and Sexualities in the Diaspora (University of Minnesota Press, 2009) discusses LGBT Puerto Rican migration from a cultural studies perspective, with chapters on Luis Rafael Sánchez, Manuel Ramos Otero, Luz María Umpierre, Frances Negrón-Muntaner, Rose Troche, Erika Lopez, Arthur Aviles, and Elizabeth Marrero. Queer Ricans is based on La Fountain-Stokes's Ph.D. dissertation, which he wrote under the supervision of Jean Franco. The author received funding for this project in 1997 from the International Migration Program at the Social Science Research Council.

His book Translocas: The Politics of Puerto Rican Drag and Trans Performance (University of Michigan Press, 2021) is on Puerto Rican and diasporic drag and trans performance and activism since the 1960s, and on the links between cross-dressing, sex/gender modification, and physical displacement in a geographic zone marked by frequent migrations. La Fountain-Stokes analyzes the work of a number of contemporary performers and activists including Sylvia Rivera, Holly Woodlawn, Nina Flowers, Monica Beverly Hillz, Erika Lopez, Freddie Mercado, Jorge Merced, Javier Cardona, Lady Catiria, Barbra Herr, and Kevin Fret.

La Fountain-Stokes has published scholarly articles in journals such as CENTRO Journal, Revista Iberoamericana, and GLQ: A Journal of Lesbian and Gay Studies, including his essay on his travels to Cuba, "De un pájaro las dos alas", which first appeared in GLQ in 2002 and was reprinted in Our Caribbean: A Gathering of Lesbian and Gay Writing from the Antilles, edited by the Jamaican American gay writer Thomas Glave. La Fountain-Stokes describes this article as a "fictionalized, experimental narrative or autoethnography based on [his] travel experiences as a gay Puerto Rican theater critic and former graduate student." He has also written on the use of animal words such as pato (duck in Spanish) to refer to homosexuality in Puerto Rico and the Caribbean.

La Fountain-Stokes frequently publishes short newspaper articles in Spanish, particularly in En Rojo, the cultural supplement of the Puerto Rican weekly Claridad. These include theater and performance reviews, book reviews, and essays on popular culture, such as his piece on a calendar by the popular Puerto Rican male model and former police officer Peter Hance. These short pieces were collected in a volume titled Escenas Transcaribeñas: Ensayos sobre teatro, performance y cultura (Isla Negra Editores, 2018). La Fountain-Stokes is also a frequent speaker at professional meetings and college campuses, and has talked about his work in several countries, including Brazil, Cuba, Mexico, Venezuela, and Spain. He has also been actively involved in a number of professional organizations, particularly the Modern Language Association, the Latin American Studies Association, the Puerto Rican Studies Association, the Caribbean Studies Association, and the City University of New York Center for Lesbian and Gay Studies (CLAGS), holding positions of leadership in several of these.

== Creative works ==
La Fountain-Stokes is best known as an author of short stories, but he has also published poetry and received awards for his plays. His first book of fiction, Uñas pintadas de azul/Blue Fingernails (Bilingual Press/Editorial Bilingüe, 2009), includes 14 short stories written in the 1990s and early 2000s, some of them while the author was enrolled in a creative writing workshop taught by the Chilean author Diamela Eltit. His second book, Abolición del pato, was published by Terranova Editores in San Juan, Puerto Rico, in 2013. His fiction has also appeared in a number of anthologies such as Bésame Mucho: New Gay Latino Fiction (1999), Los otros cuerpos: Antología de temática gay, lésbica y queer desde Puerto Rico y su diáspora (2007), and From Macho to Mariposa: New Gay Latino Fiction (2011). He has also published in journals and websites such as Blithe House Quarterly and Harrington Gay Men's Fiction Quarterly.

Most of La Fountain-Stokes's stories focus on gay Puerto Rican characters, and sometimes incorporate elements of science fiction and fantasy. The scholar Enrique Morales-Díaz has written extensively about one of these stories, "My Name, Multitudinous Mass," describing La Fountain-Stokes as a "Diasporican" author.

La Fountain-Stokes's plays include ¡Escándalo! (2003) and Uñas pintadas de azul (2006, an extension of a short story included in his book of short stories). Both of these plays have been read publicly as part of the Pregones Theater Asunción Playwrights Project in the Bronx, but neither one has been staged.

== Performance ==
La Fountain-Stokes has done solo and ensemble performance for stage and video. In 2004 he did a one-man show, Abolición del pato/Abolition of the Duck, as part of the Casa Cruz de la Luna First Experimental Festival in San Germán, Puerto Rico, and later at the Bronx Academy of Arts and Dance (BAAD!) Out Like That Festival. The main character of this piece is Lola Lolamento Mentosán de San Germán, who is accompanied by Rigoberta Quetzal and the ñusta Isabel Chimpu Ocllo. The Village Voice described Abolition of the Duck as "This is not Avenue Q" in reference to the artist's use of indigenous dolls as puppets to talk about Puerto Rican homosexuality. Starting in 2010, he has collaborated with Fausto Fernós and Marc Felion of the Feast of Fun podcast in the making of a series of YouTube videos titled Cooking with Drag Queens, in which Lola von Miramar (La Fountain-Stokes's persona) makes Puerto Rican delicacies such as tostones and coquito together with Saltina Obama Bouvier (Fernós) and Daphne DuMount (Felion). He has also done solo videos, also available on YouTube.

== Awards ==
- Harold R. Johnson Diversity Service Award, Office of the Provost and Executive Vice President for Academic Affairs, University of Michigan, Ann Arbor, 2009.
- La Celebración Latina "Circle Award", University of Michigan, Ann Arbor. (In recognition of outstanding Service to the University Community), 2008.
- ALMA (Assisting Latinos to Maximize Achievement) Appreciation Award, University of Michigan, Ann Arbor, 2006.
- Lavender Graduation Award, Office of Lesbian, Gay, Bisexual, and Transgender Affairs, University of Michigan, Ann Arbor, 2006.
- Michigan Campus Compact Faculty/Staff Community Service-Learning Award, 2006.
- Woodrow Wilson National Fellowship Foundation Career Enhancement Fellowship for Junior Faculty, 2006.
- Second place, Pregones Theater's Asuncion Playwrights Project Play Competition, for play entitled Uñas pintadas de azul, 2006.
- Fellow, Global Ethnic Literatures Seminar, University of Michigan, Ann Arbor, 2004.
- Third place, Pregones Theater Asunción Playwrights Project Play Competition, for play entitled ¡Escándalo!, 2003.
- Fellow, Center for the Critical Analysis of Contemporary Culture (CCACC), Rutgers University, New Brunswick, NJ, 2001–2002.
- Social Science Research Council International Migration Program, Minority Summer Dissertation Workshop Fellowship, Summer 1997.

== Publications ==
=== Fiction ===
- Uñas pintadas de azul/Blue Fingernails. Tempe: Bilingual Press/Editorial Bilingüe, 2009. ISBN 1931010331
- Abolición del pato. San Juan, Puerto Rico: Terranova Editores, 2013. ISBN 9781935163275

=== Non-fiction ===
- Queer Ricans: Cultures and Sexualities in the Diaspora. Minneapolis: University of Minnesota Press, 2009. ISBN 0-8166-4092-0
- A Brief and Transformative Account of Queer History/Un breve y transformador relato de la historia queer. Edited and illustrated by Dave Buchen. San Juan: Enciclopedia Deiknumena, v. 3, 2017.
- Escenas transcaribeñas: ensayos sobre teatro, performance y cultura. San Juan: Editorial Isla Negra, 2018. ISBN 9789945608052
- Translocas: The Politics of Puerto Rican Drag and Trans Performance. Ann Arbor: University of Michigan Press, 2021. ISBN 9780472074273

=== Performance texts ===
- Abolición del pato. Teatroteca Virtual "Estela" de Casa Cruz de la Luna, San Germán, Puerto Rico, 2004.

=== Videos (creative) ===
- Cooking w/ Drag Queens - Lola Von Miramar - Arroz Con Pollo (Rice with Chicken) (with Fausto Fernós and Marc Felion, Feast of Fun Podcast, Chicago). YouTube, 17 June 2015. (16:12 min.)
- How To Make Coquito - Cooking with Drag Queens (with Fausto Fernós and Marc Felion, Feast of Fun Podcast, Chicago). YouTube, 6 Jan. 2012. (5:15 min.)
- Learn Spanish by Making Cocktails (with Fausto Fernós and Marc Felion, Feast of Fun Podcast, Chicago). YouTube, 10 Sept. 2011. (7:36 min.)
- Lola von Miramar - To Cuba With Love. YouTube 21 June 2011. (10:01 min.)
- 13 Rosas y una Lola para el Amor (with Freddie Mercado, Librería Mágica, Río Piedras, Puerto Rico). Recorded by Zulma Oliveras. Courtesy of Yolanda Arroyo Pizarro. YouTube, 14 Feb. 2011. (4:37 min.)
- Cooking with Drag Queens: How to Make Tostones (with Fausto Fernós and Marc Felion, Feast of Fun Podcast, Chicago). YouTube, 16 Nov. 2010. (5:08 min.)
- Lola lee Uñas pintadas de azul. YouTube, 19 Aug. 2010. (2:11 min.)
- Los Otros Cuerpos: Manuel Ramos Otero y Rane Arroyo, In Memoriam. YouTube, 24 June 2010. (3:34 min.)
- ¡Qué Viva Ricky Martin! YouTube, 21 June 2010. (2:45 min.)

== See also ==
- LGBT literature
- LGBT rights in Puerto Rico
- List of Puerto Ricans
- List of gay, lesbian or bisexual people
- List of LGBT writers
- List of Puerto Rican writers
- Puerto Rican literature
- Puerto Ricans in the United States
- Homosexuality in speculative fiction
