= Seán Curran (dancer) =

American dancer and choreographer

Seán Curran is an American dancer and choreographer. Curran's dance company, the Seán Curran Company is based in New York City.

As a boy in the Boston suburb of Belmont, Massachusetts, Curran began dancing by learning traditional Irish step dancing. "I used to go once a week for a dollar," Curran recalled in a 1999 New York Times profile, "I learned quickly and our teachers had us performing. The dance and performing bug bit me pretty early."

Curran has performed with New York’s Danspace Project and was a lead dancer Bill T. Jones/Arnie Zane Dance Company. Curran was later an original member of the New York cast of "STOMP!", performing in the show for four years. He also created and presented a solo evening of works which has been seen in the United States, Sweden, and at France's EXIT Festival.

Curran is a graduate of New York University’s Tisch School of the Arts, where he now serves as Chair of the Department of Dance. Curran has also taught at the American Dance Festival, Harvard Summer Dance Center, Bates Dance Festival, and The Boston Conservatory as well as at more than 100 college dance departments.

Curran founded the Seán Curran Company in 1997. Since, the company has performed around the United States as well as in France, Germany, Kazakhstan, the Kyrgyz Republic and Turkmenistan.

Sean Curran Company premiered Art/Song/Dance, a collaboration Curran and the Broadway composer Ricky Ian Gordon, at the Jacob’s Pillow Dance Festival in 2004. Art/Song/Dance had its New York Premiere in 2005 at the Joyce Theatre. The Company returned to the Joyce in 2013 to present "Fireweather," a dance inspired by Dante's Inferno, and "Left Exit," which explored existential philosophy and world religions. In 2012, the Company traveled through Central Asia, performing and teaching as US cultural ambassadors sponsored by DanceMotionUSA and the US State Department.

In 2000, Curran was named in Irish American Magazine's Top 100.

In addition to teaching and his company work, Sean is often called upon to choreograph and/or direct operas and plays around the country. His opera credits include: Opera Theatre of St. Louis, San Francisco Opera, Opera Montreal, New York City Opera, and the Metropolitan Opera. His work has been seen at Lincoln Center and the John F. Kennedy Center.

Sean has also choreographed on Broadway for James Joyce's The Dead.

In 1985, while a member of the Bill T. Jones/Arnie Zane Dance Company, Curran received the award for best New York Dance and Performance at Bessie Awards for his solo performance in Secret Pastures. The New York Foundation for the Arts awarded Curran a Choreographer’s Fellowship in both 1998 and 2002. Curran has since been nominated for a Bessie Award in 2012 for "Outstanding Production of a Work that Pushes the Boundaries of a Traditional or Culturally Specific Form" for his piece Dingle Diwali created on Darrah Carr Dance.
