= Still/Here =

1994 performance piece by Bill T. Jones

Still/Here is a performance piece premiered in 1994 by American choreographer, dancer, and director Bill T. Jones (of the company Bill T. Jones/Arnie Zane Dance Company). The piece was first performed at Brooklyn Academy of Music, with music by Kenneth Frazelle (including folk singer Odetta) and Vernon Reid, and multimedia elements by Gretchen Bender. Jones utilized Survival Workshops in the development of this piece, drawing inspiration from those who have lived with a life-threatening illness. Still/Here uses a number of different mediums throughout the performance to capture the emotions of having a terminal illness, such as images, music, spoken text, videos, as well as dance.

This piece was premiered during a time that was considered to be "post-AIDS". It was known that Jones was HIV positive, and, as a result, many associated his work with HIV/AIDS, although it was about terminal illnesses in general. As HIV/AIDS was largely associated with the gay community, the existing discourse that was associated with having HIV/AIDS led to controversy surrounding the meaning and intentions of Still/Here.

== Background ==
The first documented case of acquired immune deficiency syndrome (AIDS) in America was in June 1981, in which patterns of Pneumocystis carinii pneumonia and Kaposi's sarcoma infections spread rapidly among gay men. In the first year of the epidemic, AIDS cases appeared to be isolated across the country, so there was little media attention paid to the disease. However, as cases began to be reported in infants and people with hemophilia, widespread panic surrounding the illness spread. The disease was branded as a form of "gay cancer", due to the high infection rate of AIDS in gay men. It was later renamed to gay-related immune deficiency (GRID). The disease was renamed to AIDS in 1982 after doctors learned that heterosexual patients could also contract the disease. Despite the change to a more neutral name, the stigma surrounding homosexuality in America heavily discouraged people from seeking medical attention. In other cases, AIDS patients were discriminated against in hospitals and medical centers. The epidemic led to further stigmatization of gay communities in America, as they became the targets of severe isolation, marginalization, and acts of violence. In 1987, Ronald Reagan created a Presidential Commission to tackle the AIDS epidemic, which called for increased HIV/AIDS testing, prevention and treatment of substance abuse, and stronger legislation to protect those infected with AIDS. However, Reagan's strategy proved ineffective, as he "avoided the subject of AIDS for as long as possible and provided grossly inadequate funding for research and outreach." Due to the widespread hysteria and ineffective relief programs, the AIDS epidemic in America – at its peak – lasted from 1981 to the early 1990s.

== Motivation ==
From the mid 1970s to the early 1980s, Jones and his partner, Arnie Zane, toured the world, performing sexually provocative dances. In 1982, the two founded the Bill T. Jones/Arnie Zane dance company, which became known for their diverse cast of dancers and thought-provoking subjects of dance. Jones and Zane were both diagnosed with HIV in the mid-1980s, and in 1988, Zane died from AIDS-related complications. Despite Zane's death, the Bill T. Jones/Arnie Zane dance company did not die. Instead, the dances Jones choreographed focused on racial, political, and social issues. Still/Here was a performance about death, and was heavily influenced by people's real suffering from deadly diseases like AIDS and cancer. The performance featured dancers, a musical score, visual media, and excerpts of interviews of people who received these painful diagnoses.

== Survival workshops ==
Jones based his Still/Here off of survival workshops that he hosted throughout the United States. In these workshops, people were able to talk and move about the ideas surrounding life and death. Those who attended these survival workshops suffered from terminal illnesses. These illnesses include, but were not exclusive to, HIV/AIDS, breast cancer, and cystic fibrosis. The participants could be anyone, varying in age, race, gender, and health. Jones used the survival workshops to understand how people see their illness – a gift or a burden – and how that dictates their experiences with terminal illness.

These survival workshops focused on movements and human experience. Everyone who participated in the workshops volunteered to do so. Each participant was able to speak about and act out their own personal experiences of battling with a terminal illness. These conversations and movements were videotaped for use in the piece. The process of conducting the survival workshops for inspiration was a very long process, and it became very publicized. Because what Jones was doing was so visible to the public eye, a lot of controversy and politics grew around Still/Here.

In an interview with Bill T. Jones, interviewer Thomas Piontek, asked Jones whether or not the Survival Workshops were a form of activism. Many of the women that had breast cancer, and participated in the workshops, were activists. Jones commented that the workshop participants live activism. While the piece is not intentionally political or activism, Jones' concern is with empowering those who are terminally ill, which activism also does. The inevitability that everything can somehow become political led to controversy surrounding the use of the survival workshops. Specifically, Arlene Croce, a performance critic, had said that Jones' use of the survival workshops and the materials generated from them in Still/Here was pathetic, generating a sense of pity towards the terminally ill rather than empathy. Croce never actually saw a performance of Still/Here; she refused.

== Multimedia usage ==
During the performance of Still/Here, Jones used different forms of media, such as spoken text, music, photos, and videos to enhance the engagement of the performance. The video and visual concepts were a collaboration between Jones and multimedia artist Gretchen Bender.

Although the people who performed the piece Still/Here were not sick themselves, the people that attended the survival workshops were included in the performance, through video. While the dancers performed the choreography, these videos from the survival workshops either played on the back screen, or played as audio, where the participants described their experiences with a terminal illness. The use of videos helped the audience to think about death. The use of video footage was not meant to be gross. The footage projected was mainly terminally ill people talking. The use of technology was especially embraced, as video screens that played this footage were moved around the stage, and suspended throughout the performance.

The videos were not only used in the actual performance, but Jones also used them to develop the choreography. Jones rewatched the videos that were taken from the survival workshops and studied the movements to come up with the choreography for the piece. This allowed for Jones to develop a "choreographic language" for the piece, repeating themes of people being supported by the group of dancers.

== Reception ==
Still/Here led to commentary on Jones' stylistically political productions and discussions on the role politics should play in art. The negative reviews surrounding Still/Here were from critics who disapproved of Jones' overly political art. Arlene Croce, a popular dance critic for The New Yorker, published an article 'Discussing the Undiscussable' expressing her negative views on Still/Here. Croce described the performance as a form of "victim art" and labeled Jones' work as undiscussable due to its incorporation of dying people. "I have not seen Bill T. Jones's Still/Here and have no plans to review it...What Jones represents is something new in victim art – new and raw and deadly in its power over the human conscience."

Croce's strong viewpoint elicited heavy conversation regarding the politicization of art. Other prominent dance critics responded to Croce's article. Deborah Jowitt wrote "It's ironic...that Croce, so firmly opposed to the politicization of art, chose to turn her own critical essay into a political statement by declining to see the work at hand." As politicized performances became more accepted in the dance community, Still/Here received mainly favorable reviews. One such review called Still/Here "so original and profound that its place among the landmarks of 20th-century dance seems ensured." Overall, the widespread commentary on Still/Here brought attention to Jones, as he is "probably best known outside of dance circles for his 1994 work Still/Here."

== Additional resources ==
- Vimeo for Still/Here
- Audio recording of Bill T. Jones – Inleiding on Still/Here
