= Kenneth Frazelle =

American composer (born 1955)

Kenneth Frazelle (born December 2, 1955) is an American composer.

== Early life and studies ==
Frazelle was born in Jacksonville, North Carolina, United States. Both his parents were from small tobacco farms near Richlands, North Carolina. His mother, Olive Ann Shaw, was a civil service employee at nearby Marine Corps base Camp LeJeune. His father, Kenneth Henry Frazelle, untrained but musical, died in 1962 from alcohol related illness. In the earliest years the family played musical guessing games and had a toy piano at home. The composer's mother was an excellent provider and realized the importance of music, art, and dance lessons for each of her children. At age eight Frazelle began private piano studies. He began composing at the age of ten and also played both flute and bassoon in middle school band.

The composer left home at fifteen to attend the North Carolina School of the Arts (now the University of North Carolina School of the Arts) in Winston-Salem. His principle composition teacher was Robert Ward. He was graduated from NCSA's high school in 1974.

Frazelle was accepted into the Juilliard School in 1974. Roger Sessions, his composition teacher for four years, had a profound influence on issues of musical gesture, contrapuntal discourse, and the integrity of musical form. The composer studied theory with David Diamond and ear training with Renée Longy. The experience of living in New York was vital. Attending operas; hearing Ella Fitzgerald, Oscar Peterson, Vladimir Horowitz, Leonard Bernstein and Pierre Boulez; discovering the poetry of A.R. Ammons, and attending John Cage and Elliott Carter premieres all had a great impact. He saw Pinter, Beckett and Albee plays on Broadway. He frequently visited the city's art museums and galleries. Both the work of the Abstract Expressionists and the burgeoning Minimalists were influential.

== Career ==
Frazelle's works have been commissioned and performed worldwide by some of today's most prominent artists and ensembles, such as Yo-Yo Ma, Dawn Upshaw, Odetta, Emanuel Ax, Jeffrey Kahane, Paula Robison, Cassandra Wilson, the Chamber Music Society of Lincoln Center and the Bill T. Jones/Arnie Zane Dance Company. The music has been performed at Lincoln Center, the Kennedy Center, Carnegie Hall, the Brooklyn Academy of Music, Westminster Abbey, the Concertgebouw and Wigmore Hall.

The composer's distinctive voice blends structural and tonal sophistication with a lyric clarity. He has been influenced not only by his study with the great Modernist Roger Sessions, but also by the folksongs and landscape of his native North Carolina. Critics have described the music as "sublime," "stunning," "atmospheric," "sweeping and powerful" and "spectacular."

During the composer's Juilliard years, he discovered the poetry of A. R. Ammons, which resulted in two song cycles, "Slightly Thinner Than Sight" (1976) and "Diversifications" (1978). The setting of Ammons' poetry would become a lifelong pursuit. To date he has set around forty of the poet's works.

The composition department at Juilliard in the 1970s has been described as entering a "golden age," and Frazelle was among "some of the most talented composers of the younger generation," including Ellen Taaffe Zwilich, Tobias Picker, Todd Machover, George Tsontakis, Larry Bell, Daron Hagen, Joel Hoffman, Richard Danielpour, Eric Ewazen and Bruce Adolphe.

Upon returning to Winston-Salem in 1978, the composer completed a large-scale piano work, “Fantasies for Piano,”, for NCSA piano instructor Clifton Matthews. A year later, Frazelle approached the Southeastern Center for Contemporary Art, a vital arts institution in the region, about composing a site-specific work for the Center's Main Gallery. SECCA's director, Ted Potter, encouraged the composer to create Seascapes (1981), an hour and a half work with the audience and performers seated in a giant chambered-nautilus-shaped spiral. Again, the composer returned to poems of Ammons, creating a work for mezzo-soprano and chamber orchestra. The poet contributed recorded readings of several of his works, which were interspersed among the sections of music. This was Frazelle's first work exploring environmental and theatrical elements.

In 1983, another site-specific work was composed for SECCA. Prisma was scored for three pianos and chamber orchestra, interacting with lighting design. “Prisma” premiered in 1983.

Soon after, the pianist Jeffrey Kahane was looking for a composer of his generation to champion. Kahane and Frazelle had known each other casually at Juilliard. Artist manager Elizabeth Sobol brought Frazelle's Fantasies for Piano to the attention of Kahane, who had an immediate response to the score, and instigated the composer's first commission, a quintet for piano and strings for members of the Saint Paul Chamber Orchestra. Kahane's advocacy of Frazelle's music has had a profound effect on the composer's career, resulting in the premieres or performances of fifteen works. The collaboration would also lead to orchestral residencies in the 1990s.

Kenneth Frazelle's work came to national attention when the noted singer Jan DeGaetani and pianist Gilbert Kalish premiered Worldly Hopes, in 1987, at the Southeastern Center for Contemporary Art. The composer chose five Ammons poems to comprise the cycle. A review in “Musical America” stated that "Its structural integrity, as well as its emotional depth, are truly compelling. . . Within a very tightly disciplined format, Frazelle's music—like the poems that inspired it—has a haiku-like power to suggest feelings, moods, whole landscapes, much vaster than itself. . . Especially striking is the long final song, 'Rainy morning,' which begins as a delicate nature-poem, fragments with almost cyclonic vehemence into an abstract vocal cadenza, then coalesces once more into an ecstatic climax of primal intensity." The review brought the work to the attention of Peer Southern Concert Music, Frazelle's first publisher. The work was released on Bridge Records in 2011. Kalish remembers DeGaetani working "like a woman possessed on the intricate and immensely challenging score." Worldly Hopes was among the last works that DeGaetani and Kalish premiered—she died of leukemia in 1989.

DeGaetani and Kalish discussed the immense complexity of “Worldly Hopes” with Frazelle, relating that it was the most challenging score they had ever tackled. They told him there would be very few performers who would be willing—and able—to take on scores of this difficulty. The composer took this into careful consideration, as the duo had premiered many demanding twentieth-century pieces by Elliott Carter, George Crumb, Mario Davidowsky and dozens of other composers.

Auspiciously, Frazelle had already embarked on a new aesthetic pursuit, involving the incorporation of folk music from his grandmother and great uncle. The first piece in this genre was Playing the Miraculous Game (1987). The work implemented a toy piano and three harmonicas, referencing the musical instruments around the home in Frazelle's childhood. During the composer's earliest years, his family played a musical guessing game they called "Miraculous." The first few notes would be played by Frazelle's father, and included "Froggy Went A'Courtin'" and other children's songs. The composer's hometown orchestra, the Winston-Salem Symphony, commissioned and premiered the piece, conducted by Peter Perret. The work was chosen by composer John Adams to receive a reading with the Saint Paul Chamber Orchestra. Adams has written "[Frazelle] is a mature composer with a broad cultural awareness. It seems to me that [he] has something quite fresh and original to say. He is obviously not a part of any particular stylistic juggernaut, be it downtown, uptown, East or West Coast. His work is seriously crafted and his incorporation of American vernacular music I find really very satisfying."

The Spoleto Festival commissioned the composer to write a piece for Jeffrey Kahane in 1988. Frazelle designed a rhapsodic single-movement work, Blue Ridge Airs, which wove ballads and dance tunes into a sonic landscape. This was the first of many works which either quote Blue Ridge music directly, or have a more sublimated modal or landscape quality beneath the surface of the music. Kahane performed the work at the Kennedy Center and the Montreal International Piano Festival the following year.

Yo-Yo Ma and Jeffrey Kahane commissioned Frazelle's Sonata for Cello and Piano in 1989, and performed it throughout the US, presenting it at New York's Metropolitan Museum of Art, San Francisco's Davies Hall, and Los Angeles' Ambassador Auditorium. The San Francisco Examiner reported "[it] came straight from—and went straight to—the heart, an organ too seldom addressed by contemporary composers." And the Los Angeles Times stated the Sonata "could quickly become a repertory staple."

Soon to follow was the Elegy for string orchestra (1990), which has been performed by the Colorado Symphony, the Israel Chamber Orchestra, the Buffalo Philharmonic and the Eastman Philharmonia.

Soprano Dawn Upshaw and pianist Jeffrey Kahane commissioned Sunday at McDonald's for their national tour in 1993. The cycle consists of five settings of A. R. Ammons' poems. Responding to the work, Ammons stated "I think Mr. Frazelle is the finest composer of his generation in America. . . The range of his invention and technical brilliance is apparently inexhaustible and is accompanied by a profound depth of song or feeling." In 1994, the composer's score for Bill T. Jones' dance theatre work "Still/Here" received worldwide critical acclaim. The piece incorporated movements, images and words that Jones had gathered across the country from people living with life-challenging illnesses. Gretchen Bender designed the video imagery for the piece, and rock guitarist Vernon Reid contributed music for the Here section. Jones spoke of Frazelle's contribution: "In these songs, he evoked survivors' revelations, states of mind, moments of intensity, with a power and specificity only poetry can deliver." In the Washington Post, Alan Kriegsman described it as "the perfect amalgamation of music, visual imagery, and kinetics. Kenneth Frazelle's music for 'Still' for the Lark Quartet and the staggering vocal soloist Odetta, with percussionist Bill Finizio, makes one think of the late Beethoven string quartets and their otherworldly perfection." The New York Times remarked "part Schubert, part Kurt Weill, Mr. Frazelle"s songs have their own lyric beauty."

Still/Here had its international premiere in Lyon at the Biennale Internationale de la Danse in September, 1994. The US premiere was on the Next Wave Festival at the Brooklyn Academy of Music. The work toured internationally for two years. It was filmed for Alive TV and seen by millions of viewers. The media journalist Bill Moyers made a documentary about the making of “Still/Here.” Considered one of the groundbreaking dance works of the latter part of the twentieth century, Newsweek reported “ ‘Still/Here,’ a work so original and profound that its place among the landmarks of 20th century dance seems ensured.”

The New Yorker dance critic Arlene Croce ignited a major journalistic controversy when she refused to review the piece: “In quite another category of undiscussability are those dancers I’m ‘forced’ to feel sorry for because of the way they present themselves: as dissed blacks, abused women, or disfranchised homosexuals—as performers, in short, who make out of victimhood victim art. . . Bill T. Jones seems to have been designated by his time to become the John the Baptist of victim art. (His Christ was Arnie Zane, who died of AIDS in 1988.) . . . Only the narcissism of the nineties could put Self in place of Spirit and come up with a church service that sells out the Brooklyn Academy.” Periodicals and newspapers worldwide contributed to the debate. Disagreeing with Croce’s rejection of “Still/Here” were playwright Tony Kushner, writer Joyce Carol Oates and columnist Frank Rich. And coming to Croce's defense were art critic Hilton Kramer and essayists Susan Sontag and Camille Paglia. Jazz vocalist Cassandra Wilson sang several of Frazelle's “Still/Here” songs when the choreographer revisited the work in 2004, in “The Phantom Project: Still/Here Looking On,” which toured the United States.

In 1996, the composer wrote another orchestral work exploring childhood musical imagery. “Shivaree” recaptures a New Year's Eve joyride from the early '60s, where Frazelle and his sister and cousins piled into their aunt's car, armed with pots and pans. They drove around the countryside and woke up their relatives, ushering in the new year. Actual pots and pans are part of the percussion battery of the piece. In addition to the Winston-Salem Symphony, “Shivaree” was performed by the Louisville Orchestra and the Santa Rosa Symphony. In 1997 and 1998 Frazelle was artist-in-residence at the Isabella Stewart Gardner Museum in Boston and was commissioned to write “The Motion of Stone,” one of his largest works to date, which premiered in 1998. It is a rumination on tombstones and the ephemeral nature of life, and sets passages from A. R. Ammons’ poem “Tombstones.” The composer also worked intensively on the piece at the American Academy in Rome, where he received a Visiting Regional Artist Fellowship. During Frazelle's residency at the Gardner, he met with the esteemed Harvard professor Helen Vendler. She shared her analysis of the work, and helped the composer cut the lengthy poem. The composition was not performed again until 2011, when conductor James Allbritten presented it at the University of North Carolina School of the Arts.

Yo-Yo Ma performed Frazelle's music again in 1997, with the pianist Emanuel Ax. The “New Goldberg Variations” were commissioned by Robert and Judy Goldberg, who chose Frazelle, Richard Danielpour, Christopher Rouse, Peter Lieberson, Peter Schickele and John Corigliano to contribute new variations on Bach's original aria. The “Variations” premiered at Boston's Jordan Hall, with subsequent performances at Carnegie Hall and across the US and Canada. Jeffrey Kahane served as pianist at many of the venues. Cellist Tanya Prochazka and pianist Jacques Despres recorded the “New Goldberg Variations” in 2003.

Some of the composer's most performed pieces incorporate instrumental and vocal music from the Blue Ridge Mountains. Sixteen folksongs are collected in “Appalachian Songbook I” and “Appalachian Songbook II.” Though Frazelle's ancestors are from Eastern North Carolina, they knew much of the same English balladry found in the Appalachians, and the composer has integrated their words and tunes into “Playing the Miraculous Game” and the Appalachian Songbooks.

His “Fiddler’s Galaxy,” first performed by Joseph Swensen and Jeffrey Kahane on the radio program “Saint Paul Sunday,” is often broadcast on American Public Media's “Performance Today.” The flutist Paula Robison has commissioned and championed Frazelle's “Blue Ridge Airs II,” both in its flute and orchestra version (1992) and in its flute and piano arrangement (2001). The later was recorded in 2008 with pianist Timothy Hester. A reviewer in the American Record Guide wrote “One of the best mixes of classical disciplines, useful dissonances, and an Americana atmosphere that I’ve ever heard. Everything is thought out and necessary.” “Blue Ridge Airs II” was required repertoire for the National Flute Convention in 2004.

From 1997 to 2000, Kenneth Frazelle was the composer in residence for both the Los Angeles Chamber Orchestra and the Santa Rosa (CA) Symphony. Both orchestras performed his “Laconic Variations,” based on the “Prometheus” theme Beethoven used in the Eroica Symphony. The residency culminated in his “Concerto for Chamber Orchestra” (2001) which was co-commissioned by the Boston Modern Orchestra Project. He also received a three-month Regional Visiting Artist Fellowship from the American Academy in Rome, which began in December 1997. Frazelle was awarded the Barlow International Prize in 2001, which resulted in the commission for “From the Song of Songs.” Soprano Erie Mills premiered the cycle with Jeffry Peterson as pianist. In 2004, “Epoch,” the literary journal of Cornell University, published an issue entirely devoted to the life and work of A. R. Ammons, who died in 2001. Frazelle contributed a small essay, “Setting Ammons to Music,” and the composer's song “I Went Back” was included. The journal also published a selection of letters from Ammons to Frazelle. Frazelle's “Sonata-Fantasy” for piano (2006) was premiered by the composer at the Reynolda House Museum of American Art, which commissioned the work. Its central movement is “Wildflowers,” a set of 10 character pieces depicting Blue Ridge flowers, which is often performed separately from the larger work. The same year the North Carolina Symphony commissioned and performed Frazelle's “The Swans at Pungo Lake.” The Symphony requested a short orchestral “postcard,” and the composer chose to depict an isolated place in eastern North Carolina where he had witnessed the winter migration of thousands of tundra swans and snow geese.

The composer's "Piano Trio" was the first composition commissioned by the Music@Menlo Festival. It received its premiere in 2006 with violinist Joseph Swensen, cellist David Finckel, and pianist Jeffrey Kahane. The central elegiac movement of the trio was a reaction to the Holocaust collage "Re'eh: Unto Dust" of the artist Irwin Kremen. A live recording of the premiere was issued in the “Music@Menlo Live” series.

Frazelle's works are often initiated by visual arts. He has written compositions relating to the painter Brice Marden (“Inventions to Marden”), the ancient Mimbres pottery of the American Southwest ("Sonata for Oboe and Piano"), the quilts of Gee's Bend, Alabama ("Gee's Bend Pieces"), and the ceramics of master potter Karen Karnes ("Winter Turns"). He combined his own watercolors with piano pieces in the “Book of Blue Flowers.” In the summer of 2010, Frazelle traveled to Hale County, Alabama, to explore the sites documented by photographers Walker Evans and William Christenberry. This road trip resulted in “Songs in the Rear View Mirror,” to date the composer's most autobiographical composition. It was premiered by the folksinger Laurelyn Dossett (with the composer at the piano) and tenor Anthony Dean Griffey (accompanied by Warren Jones). The work has been acclaimed as "one of the finest American song cycles in recent or distant memory. . . The cycle of 10 songs riveted attention with its deeply evocative beauty and wealth of tonal inventiveness." Mezzo-soprano Kathryn Findlen and pianist Richard Masters have performed the work throughout the US, with a New York premiere at Weill (Carnegie) Recital Hall in 2013.

Kenneth Frazelle's works from 2012 include “A Book of Days,” for clarinet, violin, and piano, commissioned by Strata. Again, the composer turned to Ammons, but this time chose to title each of the work's five movements with lines from the poet's “Tape for the Turn of the Year.” The work was favorably reviewed in Classical Voice of North Carolina: "This music was . . . simply sublime, in the deepest sense of the word, a sublimity that one rarely experiences in concert. Indeed, I think the word 'masterpiece' is not too strong for this work." The composer's “Triple Concerto,” also written in 2012, is scored for piano trio and string orchestra and premiered at the Meadowmount School of Music in August 2013. Conductor James Allbritten conducted the Meadowmount Strings, with soloists James Ehnes, violin, Robert deMaine, cello, and Eric Larsen, piano.

Upcoming projects include a vocal/chamber work about the Japanese Ukiyo-e artist Hiroshige, for the singer Kelley O'Connor, with set and lighting design. Frazelle is also composing a work for Kathryn Findlen and Richard Masters relating to the pottery and landscape of the Ancient Southwest. Organist Matthew Brown will premiere an organ work at Westminster Abbey in 2014.

Kenneth Frazelle has an exclusive publishing contract with Subito (Notevole) Music Corporation. Except for “Playing the Miraculous Game” and “Elegy for Strings,” all of the composer's works are available from Subito.

== Teaching career ==
Frazelle received his Bachelor of Music degree in 1978. That autumn he returned to Winston-Salem, NC, supporting himself by teaching piano lessons and playing freelance piano gigs. He continued to compose and began receiving performances, at first locally, and then nationally and internationally.

Kenneth Frazelle currently teaches at the University of North Carolina School of the Arts, in both the School of Music and the School of Filmmaking. He has given classes and seminars throughout the United States, including the Isabella Stewart Gardner Museum, the Chamber Music Society of Lincoln Center, Arizona State University, Duke University, the Cincinnati Conservatory, the Chamber Music and Composer's Conference of the East, Wake Forest University, and Memphis State University.

An accomplished pianist, Frazelle often collaborates with UNCSA faculty member soprano Marilyn Taylor. She premiered both “Appalachian Songbooks,” “Vanishing Birds,” and “Return,” which she recorded with Robert Brewer in 2001.

In 2005, UNCSA students and faculty honored Frazelle with a 50th birthday concert entirely of his music. The “Kenneth Frazelle Composition Scholarship” was then announced, which had been endowed by the composer's friends, family, and colleagues. It goes to a deserving composition student at UNCSA each year.

Among Frazelle's notable former students are the composer Gabriel Kahane and the jazz pianist Dan Tepfer.

== Personal life ==
Since 1983, Frazelle has lived in Winston-Salem with his life partner Rick Mashburn, who is a writer. The couple have a small farm in the nearby Blue Ridge Mountains, which continues to be a source of great inspiration. Kenneth Frazelle is an amateur watercolorist, an avid reader, a gardener, and dog lover. He has two siblings, a sister and a brother.

== List of compositions ==
Worldly Hopes (1985)—mezzo-soprano and piano
Playing the Miraculous Game (1987)—orchestra
Blue Ridge Airs I (1988)—piano
Lullabies and Birdsongs (Nine Sketches from the Blue Ridge) (1988)—piano
Sonata for Cello and Piano (1989)
String Trio (1989)
Fiddler's Galaxy (1989)—violin and piano
Clear Again (1990)—cello and piano
Elegy for Strings (to the memory of Jan DeGaetani) (1990)—string quartet, string quintet, or string orchestra
Blue Ridge Airs II (1992)—flute and orchestra
Sunday at McDonald's (1992)—soprano and piano
A Green View (1994)—cello and piano
Sonata for Harpsichord (1994)
Still (Music for Bill T. Jones’ Still/Here) (1994)—voice, string quartet, and percussion
A Still of Mirrors (1995)—piano
Sonata for Oboe and Piano (1995)
Quintet for Flute, Guitar, and String Trio (1995)
Shivaree (1996)—orchestra
Laconic Variations (1997)—chamber orchestra
New Goldberg Variations: Molto Adagio and Presto (1997)—cello and piano
Return (1998)—voice and piano
The Motion of Stone (1998)—vocal soloists, chorus, and chamber orchestra
Appearances (1999)—piano
Christmas Cards (1999)—chorus and piano
From the Air (2000)—orchestra
Appalachian Songbook I (2000)—voice and piano
The Four Winds (After Mozart) (2000)--flute, oboe, horn, and bassoon with orchestra
Blue Ridge Airs II (2001)—flute and piano
Shakespeare Sonnets (2001)—baritone and piano
From the Song of Songs (2002)—soprano and piano
Concerto for Chamber Orchestra (2002)
Inventions to Marden (2005)—piano
Sonata-Fantasy (2005)—piano
Wildflowers (from Sonata-Fantasy) (2005)--piano
The Swans at Pungo Lake (2006)—orchestra
Elixir (2006)—piano
Winter Traces (2006)--piano
Vanishing Birds (2007)—soprano and piano
Appalachian Songbook II (2008)—voice and piano
Piano Trio (2008)
Gee's Bend Pieces (2010)—trumpet, marimba, and piano
Songs in the Rear View Mirror (2010)—medium or high voice and piano
Book of Blue Flowers (2010)--piano
Violin Bonkers (2011)—violin and bongos
Winter Turns (2011)—clarinet, viola, and piano
Triple Concerto (2012)—solo violin, solo cello, and solo piano with string orchestra
A Book of Days (2012)—violin, clarinet, and piano
Psalm 18 (2013)—men's chorus and organ
Selections from Appalachian Songbooks I and II (2013)—arranged for chorus and piano
Fiddler's Galaxy (2013)—arranged for clarinet and piano
