= Freda Rosen =

American dramatist

Freda Rosen (September 7, 1945 – July 17, 2007) was an American playwright, director, political activist, life coach, social therapist and mentor to prominent choreographers including Bill T. Jones, Arthur Aviles and Amy Pivar. Her dance work collaborations with Amy Pivar through Amy Pivar Dances were frequently reviewed in the New York Times.

== Life ==
Born in the Bronx and a longtime resident of Manhattan's Upper West Side, Freda Rosen was a political activist in the gay liberation and democracy movements in the 1970s and 1980s. She studied philosophy, psychology, history and politics; was a founding member of Social Therapy; and co-edited PRACTICE: The Journal of Politics, Psychology, Sociology & Culture (1984–1987). She built and led numerous community-based organizations and co-founded Amy Pivar Dances with choreographer Amy Pivar where she produced, directed and wrote several of their dance/theater projects.

== Psychotherapy practice ==
Rosen's crown achievement was her psychotherapy practice in New York City where she conducted group, individual and couples sessions for over 10 years. As a leader in social therapy on staff at the East Side Institute for Short Term Psychotherapy from 1984 to 1995, she conducted individual, group and couples therapy. She supervised affiliated Clinic Directors in creating and developing short-term treatment models. During the 1980s she wrote a weekly syndicated column, "Sexually Speakin' and Otherwise;" appeared on numerous radio and TV programs speaking on such topics as sex and intimacy; and led workshops on sexuality, women's issues, and lesbian and gay issues. She was among the earliest contributors to the creation and development of Social Therapy, the group oriented approach to reigniting emotional development.

Rosen's practice focused on personal and professional development for nearly 15 years. It included esteemed clients like MacArthur Genius award-winners Bill T. Jones (celebrated choreographer) and Majora Carter (executive director of Sustainable South Bronx), as well as many community leaders, political organizers and artists like Academy Award Nominated filmmakers of Trouble the Water, Tia Lessin and Carl Deal, and choreographer Arthur Aviles and writer Charles Rice-González who co-founded BAAD! The Bronx Academy of Arts and Dance.

== Political activism ==
In the early 1970s Rosen became totally immersed in the movements of the time. She joined with other political activists to form Centers for Change (CFC), a collective of health, educational and political liberation centers organizing in poor and working class communities. The group began building new kinds of institutions: free schools, community-based health clinics and psychotherapy centers. This was the start of her career as a helping professional, and the beginning of her training as a Social Therapist.

Her work as an organizer of the Independent political movement from 1972 to 1995 included initiating the building of many community organizations such as the New York City Unemployed and Welfare Council, the Clinton Union of Community Woman, and the NYC Union of Lesbians and Gay Men. She also served as National Coordinator of the Coalition of Grassroots Women from 1981 to 1984 and ran for New York State Assembly in 1988.

== Dance ==
In 1990, Rosen co-founded Amy Pivar Dances, a contemporary dance theater company that performed works created in collaboration with Amy Pivar, a Bessie Award winner. Together they created eight critically acclaimed evening-length dance-theater works and numerous shorter works that dealt with a broad range of social and gender issues, with such titles as "Requiem for Communism," "The Modern Typist", and "Ecstasy of Communication" (based on the writings of Jean Baudrillard).

== Death ==
Rosen was diagnosed with lung cancer but continued her practice up until shortly before her death at age 62 in 2007.
