= Staggers =

Staggers may refer to:

== People ==
- Staggers (surname)

== Other uses ==
- Grass staggers, a metabolic disorder of cattle and sheep, caused by magnesium deficiency
- Transport tetany in livestock
- The Staggers Rail Act (1980) in the USA
- Slang for decompression sickness
- The New Statesman, a British political journal nicknamed "The Staggers"
- St Stephen's House, Oxford, England, an Anglican theological college nicknamed "Staggers"

== See also ==
- Stagger (disambiguation)
