= Staggered =

Stagger or staggered may refer to:

== Science and technology ==
=== Engineering ===
- Stagger (aeronautics), the horizontal positioning of a plane's wings
- Stagger, a motorsport term for the difference in size between right and left tires
- Staggered Pin Grid Array, a style of arranging pins on an integrated circuit package
- Staggered spinup, a method for preventing excessive power-consumption in computer disks

=== Chemistry and physics ===
- Staggered conformation, a chemical conformation of an ethane-like moiety
- Staggered fermion, a model in quantum mechanics

== Media ==
- Stagger (EP), by Poppy, 2022
- Staggered (film), a 1994 British romantic comedy film

== Society ==
- Staggered Board of Directors, a method of electing directors of a company or other organization
- Staggered elections, a method of electing members of government

== Transportation ==
- Staggered junction, a place where roads meet a main road at a slight distance apart
- Staggered truss system, a type of structural steel framing used in high-rise buildings

== See also ==
- Stagger Lee (disambiguation)
- Staggers (disambiguation)
