= Alice Teirstein =

American dance teacher and choreographer

Alice Teirstein (died November 25, 2022) was an American dance teacher and choreographer.

I Thought You Were Dead, a duet Teirstein co-choreographed and danced with Stuart Hodes, was named one of Ballet Review’s ten best dances of 1996.
