= David R. White =

American dance artistic director and producer

David White
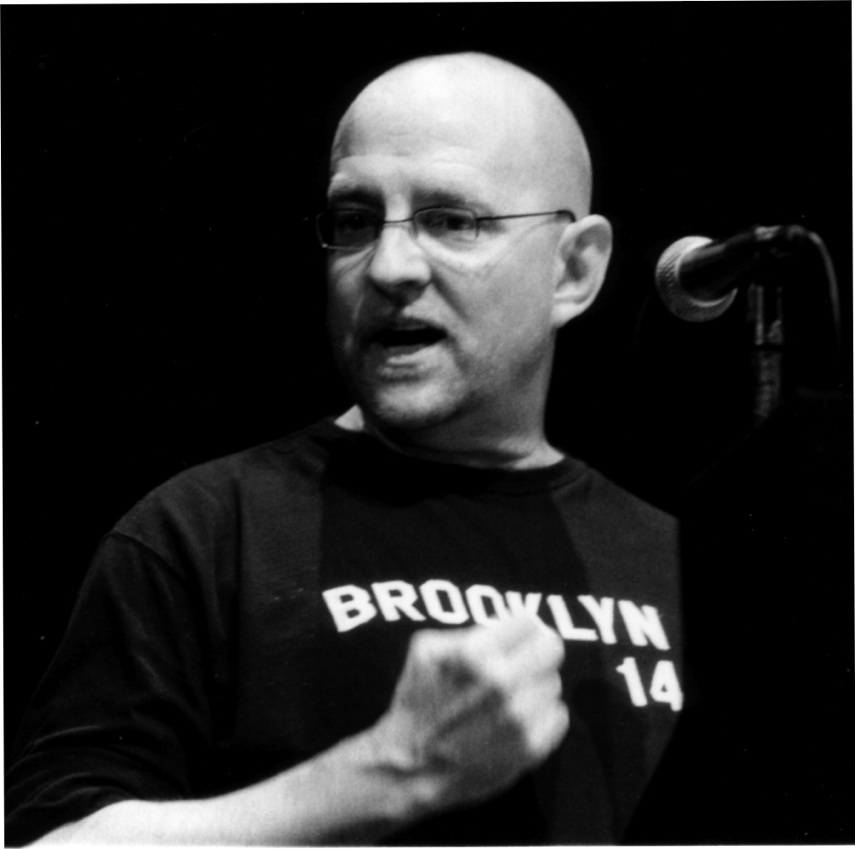
- White at Bessie Awards
- Born: David R. White
- Occupations: Artistic director, executive producer, dancer
- Years active: 1975- present
- Organizations: The Yard; Atlantic Center for the Arts

David R. White is an American artistic director and executive producer. He served as the executive director of the Dance Theater Workshop from 1975 to 2003 and is The Yard's artistic director and executive producer.

== Roles ==
- 1988–present: Chair, Atlantic Center for the Arts
- 2011–2014: Manager, Public Imaginations
- 2007–2011: Director, ARTVENTURES
- 1975–2003: Executive director and producer, Dance Theater Workshop (a.k.a. New York Live Arts)
- 1975: Co-founder, Pentacle

== Awards and honors ==
- 1987: Dance Magazine Award
- 1995: "Distinguished Alumnus" of Wesleyan University
- Knight in France's Order of Arts and Letters
- 2000: Recipient of the Dance/USA Honors
- 2000: Capezio Dance Award
- Governor of NY State Award
- Mayor of NY State Award
