= Elizabeth Marrero =

American drag king

- Born: 1963 (age 62–63); New York City, U.S.
- Other name: Macha
- Notable work: Machataso

Comedy career
- Years active: 1991–present
- Medium: Stand-up comedy; theatre; modern dance
- Subjects: Gay rights; race; Ghetto issues
- Website: Official MySpace Site

Elizabeth Marrero (born 1963) is an American of (Puerto Rican ancestry) performance artist, comedian, and drag king who is best known as Macha, the "papi chulo drag king", a character she created in 1999. Her solo and collaborative work is characterized by her open exploration of lesbian and Puerto Rican issues in a working-class or ghetto environment and by her links to stand-up comedy. She was born and lives in the Bronx, New York.

== Performance career ==
Marrero began her performance career with her first cousin, dancer/choreographer Arthur Aviles, performing the role of Maeva in over a dozen dance pieces since 1991, including Arturella (1996) and Maéva de Oz (1997). In 2003 she reappeared in Aviles's signature piece Arturella at Dance Theater Workshop in New York City. In 2001 she premiered her first one-woman show, Machataso: A One Woman Cho’ as part of the BAAD! ASS WOMEN festival, which had a three-week, sold-out, extended run at the Bronx Academy of Arts and Dance (BAAD!) in Hunts Point. In this performance, Marrero presents five different characters, including the matriarch and slightly alcoholic Petronelia, the B-boy MC DJ Guilly-Guiso-Jugo, the hip hop supermarket cashier Wakateema Shaquasha de la Rodriguez, and Macha, a suave Latino crooner that loves women. Since then Marrero has premiered a number of subsequent one-woman shows. For BAAD!'s “Out Like That” festival in June 2006, Marrero produced and performed their first ever drag king extravaganza. Marrero has also performed at Joe's Pub at the Public Theater and other major clubs in New York City, as well as internationally.

== Drag king performances ==
According to Robert Waddell, in her work as a drag king, Marrero "tackles issues of religion, sexuality, personal growth and personal responsibility." L. W. Hasten offers an extensive interview with Marrero in his academic thesis Gender Pretenders: A Drag King Ethnography, which is available online, where Marrero discusses her drag king work.

== Solo performances ==
- Machataso: A One Woman Cho’ (2001)
- Macha Does Vegas (2002)
- Petronelia’s Finca (2003)
- Petronelia: Her Broadway Cho’ (2004)
- The Macha Monologues (2005)
- Santa Macha (2006/2007)
- HBO's Habla Ya I & II (2008)
- Retro Petro (2008/2009)
- Daca Boconoa (2011)
- Wholly Macha (2015)
- KqING#19: Conversations with a KqING (2019)

== Awards ==
Marrero received a BRIO (Bronx Recognizes Its Own) Award from the Bronx Council on the Arts in 2003. She also received a Tanne Foundation Award in 2006.

== See also ==
- Comedy
- Humour
- List of comedians
- List of Puerto Ricans
- List of gay, lesbian or bisexual people
- Puerto Ricans in the United States
