= Trajal Harrell =

American dancer and choreographer (born 1973)

- Born: 1973 (age 52–53); Douglas, Georgia
- Education: Trisha Brown School, Centre National de la Dansearis, City College of San Francisco, Martha Graham School of Contemporary Dance
- Alma mater: Yale University
- Occupations: Dancer, choreographer, artist
- Years active: 2004 - present
- Notable work: Twenty Looks or Paris Is Burning at the Judson Church; The Ghost of Montpellier Meets the Samurai
- Style: Contemporary; Postmodern
- Awards: Bessie Award; Guggenheim Fellowship; Creative Capital Award
- Website: www.betatrajal.org

Trajal Harrell (born 1973) is an American dancer and choreographer. Best known for a series entitled Twenty Looks or Paris is Burning at The Judson Church, Harrell "confronts the history, construction, and interpretation of contemporary dance." He received a MacArthur Fellowship in 2026.

== Early life and education ==
Harrell was raised in Georgia. Harrell's family was well educated and well-established land owners in the south, despite their constant struggles of segregation and its discontents. His godmother named him Trajal after the well-known Roman emperor Trajan.

He graduated from Yale in 1990 with a BA in American Studies. He also studied theatre with David Herskovits, Trajal had an interest with Anne Bogart's "The Viewpoints Book"

== Career ==
Harrell's work has been presented at festivals in Paris, Vienna, Berlin, Rio De Janeiro, Montreal, and the Netherlands, and at venues including The Kitchen, New York Live Arts, the Walker Art Center, Danspace Project, Dance Theater Workshop, Performance Space 122, Philadelphia Live Arts, REDCAT, Cornell University, Colorado College, and the Institute of Contemporary Art, Boston. He has shown performance work in visual art contexts at The Museum of Modern Art, the New Museum, MoMA PS1, Fondation Cartier pour L’art Contemporain, the Bronx Museum of the Arts; Fundação Serralves, Centre Pompidou-Metz, and Art Basel.

Harrell has received fellowships from organizations including the Foundation for Contemporary Arts Grants to Artists award (2014), the John Simon Guggenheim Memorial Foundation, The Saison Foundation, the Art Matters Foundation, and the Doris Duke Foundation.

In 2019 Harrell became a resident choreographer at the Schauspielhaus Zurich and in 2024 founded the Zürich Dance Ensemble.

=== Twenty Looks or Paris is Burning at The Judson Church ===
Harrell's work, Twenty Looks or Paris is Burning at The Judson Church asks the question, "What would have happened in 1963 if someone from the vogueing ball scene in Harlem had come downtown to perform alongside the early postmoderns at Judson Church?" Harrell takes up dance history by combining these two specific and disparate groups of dance makers (separated by class, race, gender, and other categories of "identity").

Harrell's historical references are completely opposite from one another. One is a predominantly white collective of dancer, looks at minimalist art and making dance accessible to everyone, compared with the underground ball culture that consists of queer people of colour, where dancing is larger than life.

The film documentary Paris Is Burning inspired Trajal Harrell, whereby he further questions "why Judson was an accepted part of history but vogueing wasn't?"

The project began in 2009 and was completed in 2017, staged in different sizes over the years.

Twenty Looks or Paris is Burning at The Judson Church has been theorised by scholars madison moore as well as Tavia Nyong'o, in his 2018 work Afro-Fabulations: The Queer Drama of Black Life.
