= Arthur Aviles =

American dancer and choreographer

Arthur Avilés
- Born: Queens, New York, U.S.
- Education: Bard College
- Occupations: Choreographer, dancer, arts director

Arthur Avilés (born 1963) is an American Bessie Award-winning dancer and choreographer of Puerto Rican descent.

== Early life ==
Avilés was born in Jamaica, Queens, New York, and raised in Long Island and the Bronx. He graduated from Bard College, a liberal arts college in Annandale-on-Hudson, New York. After graduating from Bard, he became a member of the Bill T. Jones/Arnie Zane Dance Company, and toured internationally with the company for eight years 1987 to 1995.

== Career ==
Avilés began his own company, the Arthur Aviles Typical Theatre (AATT), in 1996 in Paris, France, and moved the company to the Bronx that same year. He also became the company choreographer for the Paris-based theatrical company Faim de Siecle, and has choreographed a series of productions that have been performed in the United States and in France.

In December 1998, he co-founded with Charles Rice-González BAAD! - The Bronx Academy of Arts and Dance, a new performance and workshop space in the American Bank Note Company Building, a warehouse in the Hunts Point section of the Bronx. In October 2013, the organization moved to Westchester Square into a gothic revivalist building on the campus of St. Peter's Episcopal Church. The New York Times called BAAD! "a funky and welcoming performance space." In addition to the Bessie Award, Avilés received an Arts and Letters Award from his alma mater in 1995, a BRIO (Bronx Recognizes Its Own) Award from the Bronx Council on the Arts (BCA) in 1999, a PRIDE (Puerto Rican Initiative to Develop Empowerment) Award honoring outstanding contributions and services to the Puerto Rican, Lesbian, Gay, Bisexual and Transgender (LGBT) Communities, a 2004 New York Foundation for the Arts Fellowship, in 2008 he received an award from NYC Comptroller Bill Thompson and a NYC Mayor's Arts Award, and 2015 received an honorary doctorate from Bard College. In 2005, AATT was among 406 New York City arts and social service institutions to receive part of a $20 million grant from the Carnegie Corporation, which was made possible through a donation by New York City mayor Michael Bloomberg.

Anna Kisselgoff of The New York Times wrote, "If you don’t know Mr. Aviles, you haven’t seen one of the great modern dancers of the last 15 years." Jennifer Dunning, The New York Times dance critic, described his work as follows: "Arthur Aviles has developed an individual voice and style that might be compared to bold street theater and poster art, communicating his truths about life as seen as a gay male Puerto Rican through simple narratives that are always colorful and often poignant and amusing."

Since 1991, Aviles has collaborated extensively with his first cousin, the comedian and performer Elizabeth Marrero. He has also collaborated with other gay Puerto Rican performers such as Jorge Merced.

Avilés is publicly gay, as he has indicated in interviews, and many of his dance pieces explore gay topics.

== See also ==
- Freda Rosen

== Additional bibliography ==
- Rivera-Servera, Ramón. "Latina/o Queer Futurities: Arthur Aviles Takes on the Bronx." Ollantay Theater Magazine 15.29-30 (2007): 127–46.
- Rivera-Servera, Ramón. "Building Home: Arthur Aviles's Choreography of the Public Space." in Performing Queer Latinidad: Dance, Sexuality, Politics (Ann Arbor: University of Michigan Press, 2012), 46–93. ISBN 0472051393
- La Fountain-Stokes, Lawrence. "A Naked Puerto Rican Faggot from America: An Interview with Arthur Avilés." CENTRO: Journal of the Center for Puerto Rican Studies 19.1 (Spring 2007): 314–29.
