= The Seven (play) =

The Seven is a 2005 musical written and composed by Will Power. Before its 2006 premiere as a two-act play at New York Theatre Workshop, the work had been developed in San Francisco as a one-act presentation. The Seven is a modernized version of the Greek tragedy, Seven Against Thebes written in 467 BC by Aeschylus, which relates a story about King Oedipus' sons, Eteocles and Polynices fighting to gain control over the city of Thebes.

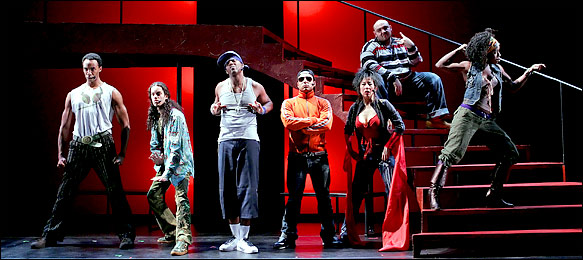

Power set his re-working of the play in a contemporary American urban setting, and used rhyming couplets and a range of musical styles such as hip-hop, soul, funk, R&B and a capella to relate to the story to contemporary concerns. Charles Isherwood, a critic for the New York Times, called the play "a strange new hybrid: a hip-hop musical comedy-tragedy."

The New York Theatre Workshop presentation was directed by Jo Bonney with choreography by Bill T. Jones. The play was awarded Lucille Lortel Awards in 2006 for Outstanding Musical, Outstanding Choreographer (Bill T. Jones) and Outstanding Sound Design (Darron L. West).
