= Stagger Lee (disambiguation) =

"Stagger Lee" is an American folk song based on the criminal Lee Shelton.

Stagger Lee may also refer to:

- "Stagger Lee (play)", stage play
- Stagger Lee (wrestler), (born 1957), wrestling ring name of James Ware
- Junkyard Dog, (1952-1998), wrestling ring name of Sylvester Ritter, who appeared as a masked wrestler named Stagger Lee for a period in 1982 after losing a loser-leaves-town match
- Lee Marshall (announcer) (1949–2014), American professional wrestling announcer often referred to as "Stagger Lee"
- Lee Shelton (1865–1912), an American murderer remembered in folklore as "Stagger Lee", among other variants

== See also ==
- Stagga Lee (born 1977), American rapper
