= Jorge Merced =

Puerto Rican actor

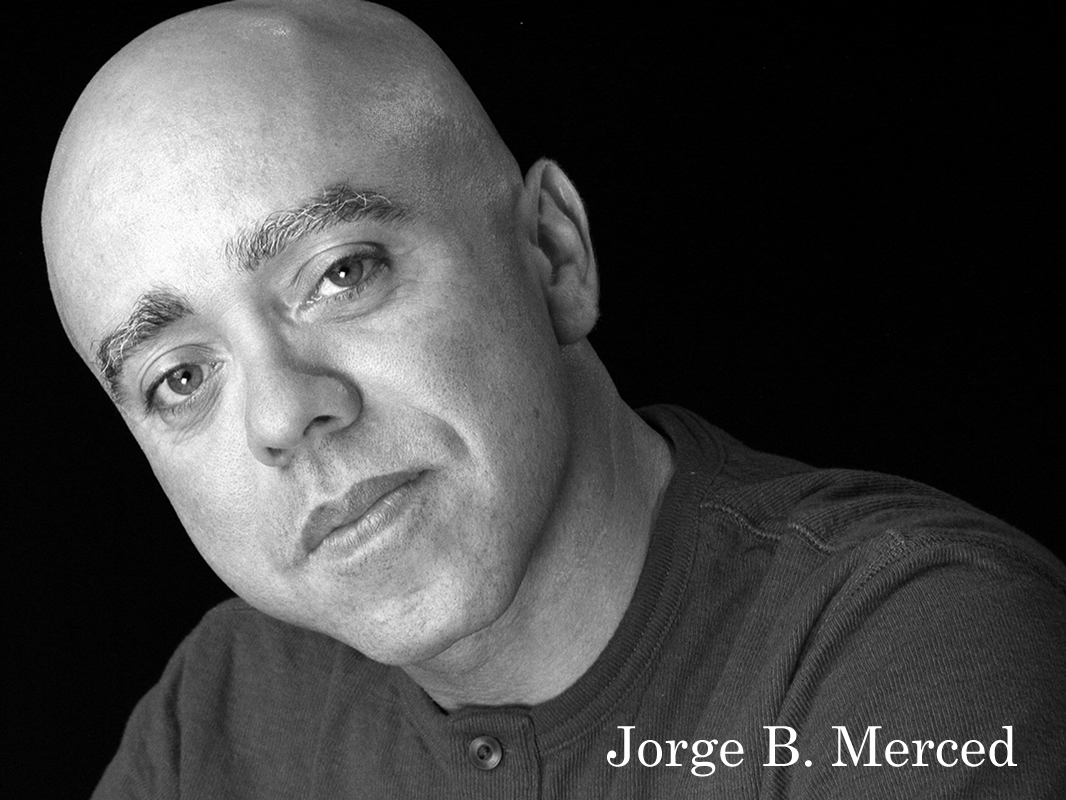
- Born: 1965 (age 60–61); Carolina, Puerto Rico
- Occupations: Actor, theatre director

Jorge B. Merced (born 1965) is a New York-based Puerto Rican actor, theatre director, and gay activist. He is associate artistic director of Pregones Theater, a bilingual (Spanish/English) Puerto Rican/Latino theater company located near Hostos Community College in the Bronx, New York City. He is best known for his role as Loca la de la locura [The Queen of Madness] in Pregones's play El bolero fue mi ruina [The Bolero Was My Downfall].

== Life ==
Merced was born and raised in Carolina, Puerto Rico, and came to the United States as an adult in 1982. He started out as a dancer in college and went on to receive an undergraduate degree from the City College of New York (CUNY) Theatre Department, also studying at the Escuela Internacional de Teatro de América Latina y el Caribe (EITALC) [International School of Latin American and Caribbean Theatre] in Cuba and at the Alvin Ailey School in New York. Merced is fully bilingual in English and Spanish and performs in both languages. He has trained, performed, and directed throughout the U.S. and abroad in Brazil, Chile, Cuba, France, Mexico, the Netherlands, Nicaragua, Peru, Portugal, Puerto Rico, Slovakia, and Spain. Merced is openlygay and has spoken about how his personal experiences in Puerto Rico and New York have been profoundly marked by his sexuality.

== Work ==
Merced's numerous professional credits include acting in and directing more than 50 theatrical productions including El bolero fue mi ruina (actor), El apagón/The Blackout (actor), Baile Cangrejero (actor), Blanco (director), El huésped vacío (director), and Brides. Creative collaborations in both dance and theater include premieres with Eduardo Alegría, Pablo Cabrera, Antonio Martorell, and Arthur Aviles.

Merced's commitment to AIDS prevention led him to spearhead Pregones's El abrazo/The Embrace from 1987 to 1993. This AIDS community education project was based on the theories of Augusto Boal and has been carefully analyzed by the Puerto Rican scholar and actress Eva C. Vásquez in her book Pregones Theatre (2003), which includes an interview with Merced.

In 2002, Merced created the Asunción Playwrights Project as a way to "showcase the work of Latino playwrights exploring issues of difference and transformation at the limits of queer identity." The project includes a play competition, public readings of up to four plays (followed by discussions with the audience), and workshop productions of the winning play. Winning playwrights have included Gonzalo Aburto (2003), Ricardo Bracho and Pablo García Gámez (2004), Charles Rice-González (2005), Chuy Sanchez (2006), and Aravind Adyanthaya (2007).

Merced's performance in Pregones's play El bolero fue mi ruina [The Bolero Was My Downfall] (1997–2002, restaged 2005) has received significant critical reception. In this one-man show (with live musical accompaniment), Merced portrays two Puerto Rican characters: Loca, an incarcerated transvestite bolero singer, and Nene Lindo [Pretty Boy], her boyfriend, whom she murdered. This Spanish-language play was directed by Rosalba Rolón. It is an adaptation of a short story by the deceased Puerto Rican gay author Manuel Ramos Otero. Merced drew heavy inspirations from memories of his youth when working on the play. As a child, Merced recalls that he would watch the shows of Antonio Pantojas, transformist, actor, comedian, dancer, and pioneer in drag on a Puerto Rican television channel. According to Merced, his father would attack him for watching Pantojas; Merced felt that this memory pertained most to his work on this play. Merced has also collaborated with the Puerto Rican gay scholar Luis Aponte-Parés in documenting the history of gay Puerto Ricans in New York City and Boston. He has spoken extensively about his gay activism in a 2001 interview with Arnaldo López.

== Awards ==
Merced has received multiple awards from the New York ACE Latino Critics and Hispanic Organization of Latin Actors (HOLA), including Best Actor and Best Director recognitions. He has also received the Puerto Rican Institute of New York Distinguished Actor/Director Award, the BRIO Bronx Artist Award, and the New York PRIDE Award for his advocacy on behalf of the Puerto Rican Transgender, Bisexual, Lesbian and Gay Community. In 2008, the New York City Spanish-language daily newspaper El Diario/La Prensa honored him with the "Él" Award as one of the 25 outstanding Latinos of the year.
