= Bill T. Jones =

Dancer, choreographer, improvisor and director (born 1952)

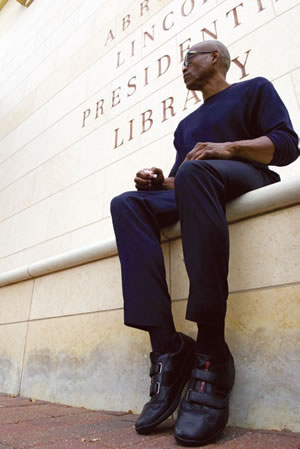
- Jones in Springfield, Illinois
- Born: William Tass Jones; February 15, 1952 (age 74); Bunnell, Florida, United States
- Education: Binghamton University
- Occupations: Choreographer, dancer
- Spouse(s): Arnie Zane; Bjorn G. Amelan

William Tass Jones, known as Bill T. Jones (born February 15, 1952), is an American choreographer, director, author and dancer. He is the co-founder of the Bill T. Jones/Arnie Zane Dance Company. The company's home is in Manhattan. Jones is Artistic Director of New York Live Arts, whose activities encompass an annual presenting season together with allied education programming and services for artists. Independently of New York Live Arts and his dance company, Jones has choreographed for major performing arts ensembles, contributed to Broadway and other theatrical productions, and collaborated on projects with a range of fellow artists.

== Early life and education ==
William Tass Jones was born on February 15, 1952 in Bunnell, Florida, the tenth of 12 children born to Estella (née Edwards) and Augustus Jones. His parents were migrant farm workers and later worked in factories. In 1955, when Jones was three, the family relocated to Wayland, New York. Jones was a track star in high school and also participated in drama and debate. After his high school graduation in 1970, he began to attend Binghamton University via a special admissions program for underprivileged students. At Binghamton, he shifted his focus to dance. In an interview, Jones noted: "[Binghamton] was where I first took classes in west African and African-Caribbean dancing. Soon I started skipping track practice to go to those classes. It immediately appealed to me. It was an environment that was not about competition." Jones's dance studies at Binghamton also encompassed ballet and modern dance.

== Career ==
=== Early years ===
During his 1971 freshman year at Binghamton, Jones met and fell in love with Arnie Zane, a 1970 graduate of the university who was living in the area honing his skills as a photographer. The personal connection they forged evolved into a personal and professional relationship that lasted until Zane's death from AIDS in 1988. About a year after meeting, the pair spent a year in Amsterdam, Netherlands. On returning, Jones and Zane connected with dancer Lois Welk, who introduced them to contact improvisation, an emerging dance technique popularized by Steve Paxton that emphasizes intertwining partnering and shifts of weight and balance between partners. With Welk and another dancer, Jill Becker, they formed American Dance Asylum (ADA) in 1974. ADA was organized as a collective and performed nationally and internationally while also offering classes and presenting performances at its space in Binghamton. While the members of ADA generally choreographed their own works, they used a collaborative development process in which each member informed the activities of the others. Jones created a number of solo pieces during this period and was invited to present in New York City beginning in 1976, performing at The Kitchen, Dance Theater Workshop, and the Clark Center for the Performing Arts, among other venues.

Jones's works during this period, such as Floating the Tongue (1979) and Everybody Works/All Beasts Count (1975), combined his elegant style of movement with spoken passages that explored and improvised on his reactions and memories evoked by the dancing, ranging from episodes in his life to digressions on social issues. Dance historian Susan Foster has characterized these works as using "the resonances between movement and speech to show the very mechanics of meaning-making and to deepen viewers' perceptions of the number of ways a movement can mean."

In 1979, Jones and Zane felt that their collaboration with Welk and Becker had reached its conclusion. They were also interested in living in an area more supportive of both the art they were making and their identity as an interracial gay couple. They moved to the New York area in late 1979, settling in Rockland County, where they soon bought a house.

The physical contrast between Jones (tall, Black, gracefully athletic) and Zane (short, White, sharply moving), together with contact improvisation techniques of intertwining and lifting formed the basis of many of the pair's dances during this period. The works they created together fused Jones's interest in movement and speech with Zane's visual sensibility rooted in his work as a photographer. Their duets featured film projections, stop-and-go movement and framing drawn from still photography, singing, and spoken dialogue. At the forefront of their works was their political and social focus, and the unusual—for the period—pairing of two male dancers and a frank acknowledgement of their personal relationship. A trilogy of duets the pair created during this time, consisting of Blauvelt Mountain (1980), Monkey Run Road (1979) and Valley Cottage (1981), firmly established their reputations as important new choreographers.

=== Bill T. Jones/Arnie Zane Dance Company ===
From the mid-1970s until 1981, Jones and Zane toured the world dancing sexually provocative duets. Jones had also danced solos. In 1982, the pair formed the Bill T. Jones / Arnie Zane Dance Company, recruiting a troupe of individualistic and nontraditional performers who represented different body sizes, shapes, and colors." "Jones, a choreographic provocateur, presents his ideas about identity, art, race, sexuality, nudity, power, censorship, homophobia, and AIDS-as-chemical-warfare with a streetwise, in-your-face attitude." Works such as Last Supper at Uncle Tom's Cabin/The Promised Land (1990) and Still/Here are some of his most thought-provoking works.

=== Last Supper at Uncle Tom's Cabin ===
Last Supper at Uncle Tom's Cabin/The Promise Land premiered in 1990, two years after Jones lost his life partner, Arnie Zane. Throughout his career, Jones' sense of alienation from society and its constructs and politics regarding race, gender, and sexuality inform his choreographies, and this work is no different. In particular, Jones said that Last Supper at Uncle Tom's Cabin/The Promise Land is about how "we" (performers, choreographers, and audience) can navigate through differences to arrive at a commonality. Jones's work contains four acts; the first three engage with his and the performers' personal histories and their interfacing with social histories through images, citations, and references, and the last segment engages with the philosophy of liberation, the definition of home, and commonality amongst differences.

Act 1: The Cabin examines and rearranges the story of Harriet Beecher Stowe's Uncle Tom's Cabin. The Cabin provides a revisionist history of the character of Uncle Tom through citations (both personal and historic). Jones uses images from his personal history of people being punished to portray violence and death. Jones acquired these images through his and his mother's memories; he noticed, in retrospect, that stories about whipping that his mother told him resonated with him and influenced the whipping choreography.

Rather than revising history, Act 2: Eliza engages with the counterfactual history of what would have been true for Harriet Beecher Stowe's character Eliza if circumstances were different. Jones explored these "what ifs" through movements and the identities of his performers. He created five Elizas, each with unique movement profiles informed by Jones's experience and the experiences of the dancer representing each Eliza, which allow the audience to infer the range of emotional states and desires among five versions of the same character. The first represents a historical Eliza accompanied by Sojourner Truth's "Ain't I A Woman" speech. The dancer's movements reference Jones' memory of his grandmother resting her hands on a hoe; her intermittent joy is captured in the sway of her hips. The second is a modern-day Eliza who engages with the "evils of sexism"; her tight fists portray her anger. The third controls men, but her personal fears remain inside her; her strength manifests through an uncompromising spine. The fourth Eliza lacks autonomy, shown through the limp arms in her choreography; she needs her identity awarded back. A man dances the last Eliza in a mini skirt and heels; he intensely invites the audience to make assumptions about racial and gender identity. Jones engaged with far-reaching social predicaments and personalized ones that he and his dancers experienced to signal the "what-ifs" of Stowe's Eliza.

Jones described Act 3: The Supper as a dialogue with his mother's faith. The Last Supper was a prominent image in the houses that Jones grew up in. Further, Jones recognizes it as a shared experience in poor homes in general. He deconstructs the Last Supper image and exposes all the questions it does not answer through a chaotic tableau that ends in a rap about justice.

The final section, The Promise Land, was the most controversial at the time, and it was not always performed, but when it was, local community members were cast in the production. Nudity is the central image of this section; at the beginning, a nude body starts as one painful and undesirable thing, and by the end, the audience can see nudity as a commonality among all people. This found commonality is not a resolution but rather stillness and peace.

Last Supper at Uncle Tom's Cabin/The Promise Land confronts the trials and tribulations of those outside the typical constructs of society, leaving people with the question, how many groups of people and experiences can be taken under the saying "free at last?" (one last reference to the Black American experience).

==== Still/Here controversy ====
Although Last Supper at Uncle Tom's Cabin/The Promised Land was one of Jones's largest and most political productions, the 1995 New York premiere of Still/Here led to a great deal of controversy and discussion. Still/Here is about dying, based on videotaped statements of people suffering from deadly diseases such as AIDS and cancer. It features a video score by artist Gretchen Bender based on excerpts from interviews with people who had received such diagnoses, together with a commissioned musical score, spoken text and movement. This work raises the question of whether art should be political. Most critical comments were favorable for the production, especially since many dancers were affected by AIDS. Still/Here was well received on its 1994 international tour. Newsweek called it "a work so original and profound that its place among the landmarks of 20th-century dance seems ensured." However, Arlene Croce, dance critic for The New Yorker, wrote in her article "Discussing the Undiscussable" a sharp negative critic of artists who present themselves as victims. Croce was so disgusted by "victim art" that she refused to see the production. Croce blamed politics for the sensation of victim art. "The arts bureaucracy in this country, which includes government and private-funding agencies, has in recent years demonstrated a blatant bias for utilitarian art-art that justifies the bureaucracy's existence by being socially useful."

Croce's essay generated considerable discussion, pro and con. The next issue of the New Yorker (January 30, 1995) featured four pages of letters about the article from prominent cultural figures such as Robert Brustein, bell hooks, Hilton Kramer, Camille Paglia and Tony Kushner. In dissent, critic bell hooks observed: "To write so contemptuously about a work one has not seen is an awesome flaunting of privilege—a testimony to the reality that there is no marginalized group or individual powerful enough to silence or suppress reactionary voices. Ms. Croce's article is not courageous or daring, precisely because it merely mirrors the ruling political mood of our time." Many other liberals, such as Richard Goldstein from the Village Voice also sharply criticized Croce. Deborah Jowitt, a dance critic for the Village Voice wrote "It's ironic…that Croce, so firmly opposed to the politicization of art, chose to turn her own critical essay into a political statement by declining to see the work at hand." Yet other critics chose not to see this work either because they have been unimpressed with Jones choreography in his past productions or because works based on racism, sexism, AIDS have become predictable. Either way, Croce's article is successful at bringing attention to the politicization of the American Arts. Croce argues for "the autonomy of art" or "art for art's sake". However, "opposing the politicization of art is now taken to be a political act". .. The debate broadened to the national press. Author Joyce Carol Oates noted in The New York Times: "As with the Mapplethorpe obscenity trial of several years ago, the article has raised crucial questions about esthetics and morality, about the role of politics in art and about the role of the professional critic in assessing art that integrates 'real' people and events in an esthetic framework." The coverage brought Jones to wider attention. In 2016, Newsweek wrote, "Jones is probably best known outside of dance circles for his 1994 work Still/Here."

=== Other collaborators ===
Creating more than 100 works for his own company, Jones has also choreographed for Alvin Ailey American Dance Theater, AXIS Dance Company, Boston Ballet, Lyon Opera Ballet, Berlin Opera Ballet and Diversions Dance Company, among others. In 1995, Jones directed and performed in a collaborative work with Toni Morrison and Max Roach, Degga, at Alice Tully Hall, commissioned by Lincoln Center's "Serious Fun" Festival. His collaboration with Jessye Norman, How! Do! We! Do!, premiered at New York's City Center in 1999.

In 1989, Bill T. Jones choreographed D-Man in the Waters. The AIDS epidemic was at an all-time high and the arts community was being greatly affected by it. After the death of company member, Demian Acquavella, Bill T. Jones decided to choreograph this piece in his honor. He raised awareness about the horrors of the disease by highlighting Acquavella's absence in the piece. The piece feature a lot of lifting to symbolize the unity that Bill T. Jones wanted to achieve as a society. Men lifting men, women lifting women, and women lifting men. D-Man in the Waters is a beautiful and moving piece of art that uses movement and lack thereof to portray the horrors of the AIDS epidemic, the loss of those affected by it, and the desperation to come together and find a solution.

In 1990, Jones choreographed Sir Michael Tippett's New Year under the direction of Sir Peter Hall for the Houston Grand Opera and the Glyndebourne Opera Festival. He conceived, co-directed and choreographed Mother of Three Sons, which was performed at the Munich Biennale, New York City Opera, and the Houston Grand Opera. He also directed Lost in the Stars for the Boston Lyric Opera. Jones's theater involvement includes co-directing Perfect Courage with his sister and prolific performance artist, Rhodessa Jones for Festival 2000, in 1990. In 1994, he directed Derek Walcott's Dream on Monkey Mountain for The Guthrie Theater in Minneapolis, MN.

Jones also collaborated with artist Keith Haring in 1982 to create a series of both performance and visual arts together.

=== Broadway and off-Broadway ===
In 2005, Jones choreographed the New York Theatre Workshop production of The Seven, a musical by Will Power based on Seven Against Thebes by the classical Greek playwright Aeschylus. The Seven transposed the original work to a modern urban setting and employed a range of musical styles to create what one reviewer called, "a strange new hybrid: a hip-hop musical comedy-tragedy." The play was recognized with three Off-Broadway Lucille Lortel Awards, including Outstanding Choreography, given to Jones.

Jones was choreographer for the Broadway premiere of the 2006 rock musical Spring Awakening, developed by composer Duncan Sheik and lyricist Steven Sater, and directed by Michael Mayer. The play is based on an 1891 German work that explores the tumult of teenage sexuality. Spring Awakening was widely acclaimed at its premiere and later won eight 2007 Tony Awards, in addition to a range of other recognitions. Jones was recipient of the 2007 Tony Award for Best Choreography.

Jones is co-creator, director and choreographer of the musical Fela!, which ran off-Broadway in 2008 and opened on Broadway in 2009. Jones's collaborators on the project were Jim Lewis and Stephen Hendel. The play is based on events in the life of Nigerian musician and activist Fela Kuti and is inspired by Fela: This Bitch of a Life, a 1982 authorized biography of Kuti by Carlos Moore. The Broadway presentation won three Tony Awards, including Best Choreography.

In 2010, he became a Kennedy Center Honoree. Introduced by 1996 Kennedy Center Honoree Edward Albee and a speech by Claire Danes, the performance was "I Sing The Body Electric", a poem written by Walt Whitman in 1856. Also honored that year were talk show host/actress Oprah Winfrey, lyricist/composer Jerry Herman, country singer/songwriter Merle Haggard, and singer/songwriter/musician Paul McCartney.

In June 2019, to mark the 50th anniversary of the Stonewall riots, an event widely considered a watershed moment in the modern LGBTQ rights movement, Queerty named him one of the Pride50 "trailblazing individuals who actively ensure society remains moving towards equality, acceptance and dignity for all queer people".

=== Opera ===
In 2017, Jones served as director, choreographer, and dramaturge for the world premiere of We Shall Not Be Moved, written by composer Daniel Bernard Roumain and librettist Marc Bamuthi Joseph. The work was commissioned by Opera Philadelphia and was listed by the New York Times as one of the best classical performances of 2017.

== Personal life ==
Jones first married Arnie Zane.

Jones is married to Bjorn Amelan, a French national who was raised in Haifa, Israel and several countries in Europe. The two have been together since 1993. Amelan was the romantic and business partner of noted fashion designer Patrick Kelly from 1983 until Kelly's death from AIDS complications in 1990. In addition to pursuing his own work as a visual artist, Amelan is Creative Director of the Bill T. Jones/Arnie Zane Dance Company and has designed many of the company's sets since the mid-1990s. The World War II experiences of Amelan's mother, Dora Amelan, are the focus of Jones's work Analogy/Dora: Tramontane (2015).

Jones and Amelan live in Rockland County, New York, just north of New York City, in a house purchased in 1980 by Jones and Arnie Zane. Despite Jones's long association with New York's performing arts and cultural life, he has never resided in the city.

One of Jones's sisters, Rhodessa Jones, is a noted San Francisco performance artist, prison-arts educator and Co-Artistic Director of the performance ensemble Cultural Odyssey. Jones's nephew, Lance Briggs, is the subject of two works performed by the Bill T. Jones/Arnie Zane Dance Company, Analogy/Lance (2016) and Letter to My Nephew (2017). Both explore the trajectory of Briggs's life, which descended from promise as a dancer, model and songwriter to involvement with drugs and prostitution, an AIDS diagnosis and becoming paraplegic.

== Selected works ==
Jones has choreographed more than 120 documented works. The following is a representative selection highlighting collaborations with or commissions from notable companies or artists.

=== Bill T. Jones and Arnie Zane ===
- Pas de Deux for Two (1973)
- Across the Street (1975)
- Monkey Run Road (1979)
- Blauvelt Mountain (1980)
- Valley Cottage (1981)
- Rotary Action (2020)
- Intuitive Momentum (1983) [Music, Max Roach; decor, Robert Longo]
- Secret Pastures (1984) [Decor, Keith Haring; costumes, Willi Smith]
- The Animal Trilogy (1986)
- The History of Collage (1988)

=== Bill T. Jones ===
- Everybody Works/All Beasts Count (1975)
- Holzer Duet... Truisms (1985) [Text by Jenny Holzer]
- Virgil Thomson Etudes (1986) [Costumes, Bill Katz & Louise Nevelson]
- D-Man in the Waters (1989)
- It Takes Two (1989)
- Last Supper at Uncle Tom's Cabin/The Promised Land (1990)
- Absence (1990)
- Broken Wedding (1992)
- Still/Here (1994)
- We Set Out Early...Visibility Was Poor (1997)
- Black Suzanne (2002)
- Chapel/Chapter (2006)
- A Quarreling Pair (2006)
- Serenade/The Proposition (2008)
- Fondly Do We Hope...Fervently Do We Pray (2009)
- Story/Time (2014)

=== Commissions and collaborations ===
- Fever Swamp (1983) [Commission from Alvin Ailey American Dance Theater]
- Mother of Three Sons (1991) [Commission from New York City Opera
- Broken Wedding (1992) [Commission from Boston Ballet]
- Degga (1995) [Collaboration with Max Roach and Toni Morrison]
- 24 Images per Second (1995) [Commission from Lyon Opera Ballet]
- How! Do! We! Do! (1999) [Collaboration with Jessye Norman]li
- Bill and Laurie: About Five Rounds (1996) [Collaboration with Laurie Anderson]
- A Rite (2013) [Collaboration with Anne Bogart/SITI Company]

== Major awards and honors ==
- 1986, New York Dance and Performance "Bessie" Award, Freedom of Information (Choreography/Creator; w/ Arnie Zane)
- 1989, New York Dance and Performance "Bessie" Award, D-Man in the Waters (Choreography/Creator)
- 1991, Dorothy B. Chandler Performing Arts Award
- 2001, New York Dance and Performance "Bessie" Award, The Breathing Show & The Table Project (Choreography/Creator; w/ Bjorn Amelan)
- 2003, The Dorothy and Lillian Gish Prize
- 2005, Samuel H. Scripps American Dance Festival Award for Lifetime Achievement in Choreography
- 2005, The Wexner Prize
- 2006, Lucille Lortell Award, The Seven (Outstanding Choreography)
- 2007, New York Dance and Performance "Bessie" Award, Chapel/ Chapter (Choreography/Creator)
- 2007, Off-Broadway Theater "Obie" Award, Spring Awakening (Music: Choreography)
- 2007, Tony Award, Spring Awakening (Best Choreography)
- 2007, United States Artists Fellowship
- 2008, The MacArthur Fellowship
- 2009, Lucille Lortell Award, Fela! (Outstanding Musical)
- 2010, Officier de l'Ordre des Arts et des Lettres, République française
- 2010, Tony Award, Fela! (Best Choreography)
- 2010, Kennedy Center Honors
- 2011, The YoungArts Arison Award
- 2013, New York Dance and Performance "Bessie" Award, D-Man in the Waters (Outstanding Revival)
- 2013, The National Medal of Arts
- 2014, The Doris Duke Performing Artist Award
- 2014, Washington University International Humanities Prize
- 2018, The James Robert Brudner Memorial Prize at Yale University
- 2022, Chita Rivera Award, Paradise Square (Outstanding Choreography in a Broadway Show; with Garrett Coleman and Jason Oremus)

== Filmography ==
=== Film appearances ===
- 1986: The Kitchen Presents Two Moon July
- 1994: Black Is... Black Ain't
- 2001: Free to Dance
- 2004: Bill T. Jones: Dancing to the Promised Land
- 2008: The Black List: Volume One
- 2008: The Universe of Keith Haring
- 2008: Bill T Jones – Solos
- 2021: Can You Bring It: Bill T. Jones and D-Man in the Waters

== See also ==
- Freda Rosen
- LGBT culture in New York City
- List of LGBT people from New York City
- NYC Pride March
