= Dance Theater Workshop =

Former New York City dance and performance venue

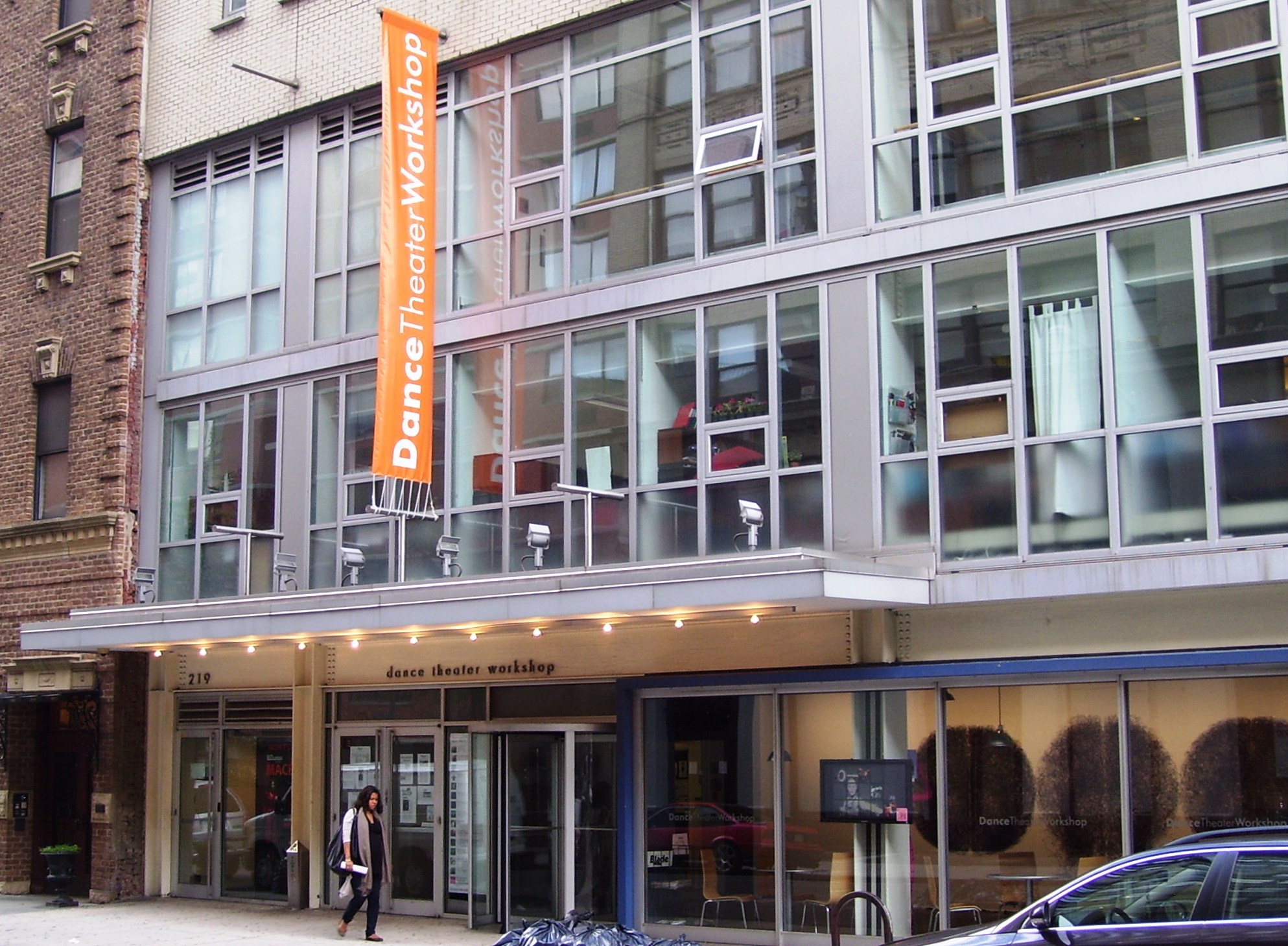
Dance Theater Workshop at 219 West 19th Street in 2010, before becoming New York Live Arts

Dance Theater Workshop, colloquially known as DTW, was a New York City dance and performance venue and service organization for dance companies that operated from 1965 to 2011. DTW merged with the Bill T. Jones/Arnie Zane Dance Company to form New York Live Arts, which continues in operation as of 2025.

== History ==
Located as 219 West 19th Street between Seventh and Eighth Avenues in the Chelsea neighborhood of Manhattan, DTW was founded in 1965 by Jeff Duncan, Art Bauman and Jack Moore as a choreographers' collective.

In the fall of 1965, the Dance Theater Workshop produced a series of Monday evening concerts at the East 74th Street Theater, an Off-Broadway theater at 334 East 74th Street on the Upper East Side of Manhattan. In 1966, it hosted a subscription series devoted to modern and ethnic dance.

From 1975-2003, DTW was led by David R. White as Executive Director and Producer. Under White's leadership, DTW became one of the most influential contemporary performing arts centers and artist incubators in the United States and abroad. More than 200 concerts and exhibits by some 70 contemporary dance, theater, music, visual and video artists were sponsored annually by the organization.

DTW was responsible for identifying and nurturing some of the most important dance and other performing artists of the time, including: Mark Morris, David Gordon, Bill T. Jones, Laura Dean, Susan Marshall, Donald Byrd, H.T. Chen, David Dorfman, Molissa Fenley, Whoopi Goldberg, Margaret Fisher, Janie Geiser, Bill Irwin, Ralph Lemon, Bebe Miller, Michael Moschen, David Parsons, Lenny Pickett, Merián Soto, Pepón Osorio, Paul Zaloom, Guillermo Gomez-Pena, Anne Teresa de Keersmaeker, Annie-B Parson and Paul Lazar, Donald Byrd and John Jasperse, and hundreds of others.

=== Expansion and merger ===
In 2002 DTW opened its new Doris Duke Performance Center, which contains the 192-seat Bessie Schönberg Theatre. The organization took on a significant amount of debt to construct the building, which includes offices and rehearsal studios.

In 2011, DTW merged with the Bill T. Jones/Arnie Zane Dance Company to become New York Live Arts The move came out of a need for greater financial stability for both organizations, and a permanent home for the dance company, which had sought one for many years.

== See also ==
- List of theaters for dance
