= Arlene Croce =

American journalist, writer, and critic (1934–2024)

- Born: May 5, 1934; Providence
- Died: December 16, 2024 (aged 90); Johnston
- Occupations: Journalist, art critic, dance critic, film critic, dancer
- Awards: Guggenheim Fellowship (dance research, 1971)

Arlene Louise Croce (/ˈkroʊtʃiː/; May 5, 1934 – December 16, 2024) was an American dance critic. She co-founded Ballet Review magazine in 1965 and served as its first editor. From 1973 to 1996 she was a dance critic for The New Yorker magazine.

== Background ==
Croce was born to an Italian-American family in Providence, Rhode Island, on May 5, 1934. She later grew up in Asheville, North Carolina, after her family moved there, and studied at the Woman's College of the University of North Carolina, before graduating from New York's Barnard College in 1955.

== Career ==
Prior to Croce's long career as a dance writer, she also wrote film criticism for Film Culture and other magazines. In 1965, she was one of the founders of Ballet Review. She joined The New Yorker in 1973. The keynote of her criticism can be grasped from her ability to evoke kinesthetic movement and expressive images in her writing. Although she considered ballet to epitomize the highest form of dance, she also wrote extensively on the topic of popular and filmed dance, and was a recognized authority on the Astaire and Rogers musical films.

In 1994, she courted controversy with her stance on Bill T. Jones's Still/Here, a work about terminal illness. In an article called "Discussing the Undiscussable", she dubbed the work "victim art" and refused to attend any performances, claiming that it was "unreviewable" because Jones featured commentary from actual terminal patients in the performance. The article became highly controversial, with numerous writers and artists publicly defending or rebuking Croce. The article was reprinted in her 2000 book, Writing in the Dark.

Her writings on dance are available in several books, and a sampling of her film criticism can be found in the anthology American Movie Critics: An Anthology From the Silents Until Now.

== Death ==
Croce died from complications of a stroke at a care facility in Johnston, Rhode Island, on December 16, 2024, at age 90.

== Bibliography ==
=== Books ===
- The Fred Astaire & Ginger Rogers Book (1972)
- Afterimages (1978)
- Going to the Dance (1982)
- Sight Lines (1987)
- Writing in the Dark, Dancing in 'The New Yorker' (2000)
- American Movie Critics: An Anthology From the Silents Until Now (2006), edited by Phillip Lopate — contains her reviews on the films Pather Panchali and Aparajito as well as a selection from The Fred Astaire & Ginger Rogers Book.

=== Articles ===
- Croce, Arlene (January 28, 1985). "Dancing: Experiments". The New Yorker. Vol. 60, no. 50. pp. 81–85. Gail Conrad and The Tap Dance Theatre; American Ballet Theatre's performance of Field, Chair and Mountain by David Gordon.
- About Arlene Croce (in Spanish). La crítica en la danza. "Discussing the indiscussable". By Patricia Roldán
- The Dance Criticism of Arlene Croce (2005) by Marc Raymond Strauss, McFarland & Co, ISBN 978-0786423507
