= Stagger Lee (play) =

Musical written by Will Power

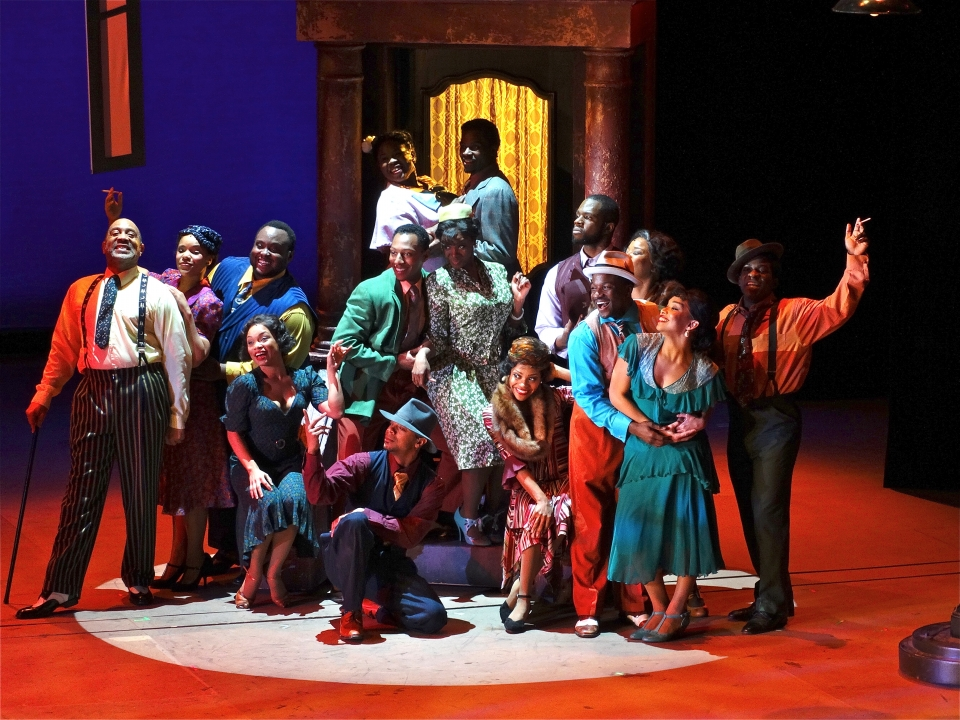

Stagger Lee is a musical written by Will Power and co-composed by Justin Ellington. According to BroadwayWorld.com, "Stagger Lee was partially developed in workshops in collaboration with the Meadows School of the Arts, Southern Methodist University in Dallas, Texas, as a part of Will Power's Meadows Prize residency." The musical takes place in the 20th century and focuses on black urban myths and racism against African-American community. The play observes different mythical characters on a journey through generations as they strive to achieve the American Dream.
