= Staggers (surname) =

Staggers is a surname. Notable people with the surname include:

- Harley Orrin Staggers (1907–1991), politician from the U.S. state of West Virginia and namesake of the Staggers Rail Act of 1980
- Harley O. Staggers, Jr. (born 1951), politician from the U.S. state of West Virginia
- Jon Staggers (born 1948), American football player
- Kermit Staggers (1947–2019), American politicians
- Margaret Anne Staggers (1945–2026), politician from the U.S. state of West Virginia
- Noelle Staggers, contestant on America's Next Top Model, Cycle 4, TV series
