= Will Power (performer) =

American playwright and rapper

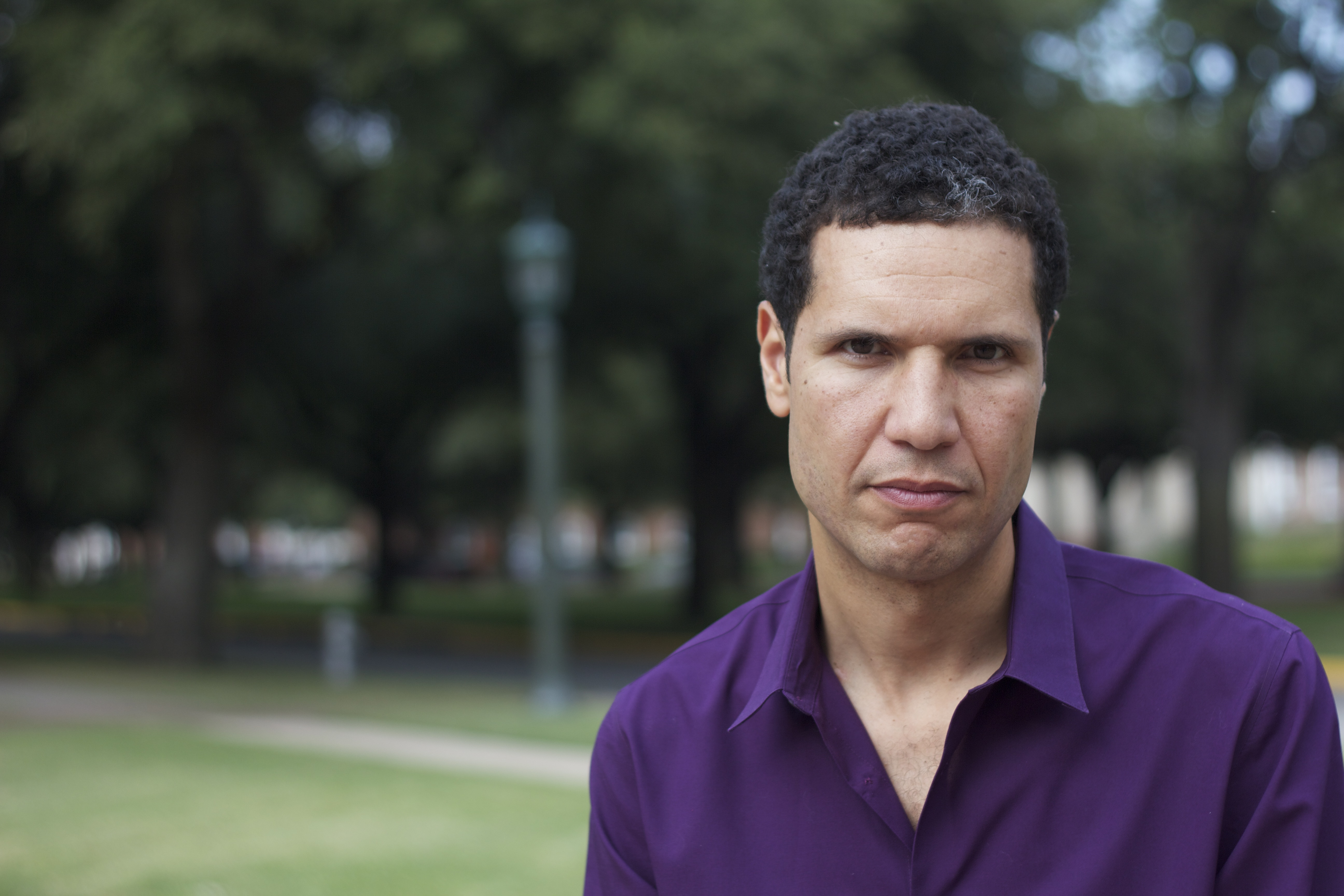
- Born: June 22, 1970 (age 56)
- Education: New York University (1988-1990); San Francisco State University (BA)
- Occupations: Playwright, actor, professor
- Relatives: George Gregory, Jr. (grandfather); Lateefah Simon (cousin); Jazmyn Simon (cousin)

Will Power is an American playwright, rapper, actor, and educator. He is the co-adaptor of the Broadway revival of Damn Yankees. Power has a longstanding collaboration with the Classical Theatre of Harlem, where he is developing the AEthiopes trilogy, a series of plays that explore the forgotten African heroic figures in the Greek mythology cannon.

The trilogy consists of Memnon, which received its world premiere at the Getty Villa and its New York premiere at the Classical Theatre of Harlem; Andromeda, scheduled to receive its world premiere at the Classical Theatre of Harlem in 2027; and Blood of Odysseus, scheduled to premiere at the Classical Theatre of Harlem in 2028.

== Career ==
A pioneer in the genre of hip hop theatre, Power helped to create an influential new form of theater that fuses original music, rhymed dialogue, and choreography. His adaptation of the Greek tragedy Seven Against Thebes, entitled The Seven, had a successful Off-Broadway run at the New York Theatre Workshop.

Power is also the author of many well received plays. In January 2010 McCarter Theatre Center premiered Fetch Clay, Make Man. The play focuses on the relationship between Muhammad Ali, the famous boxer, and Stepin Fetchit, an African-American actor, on the eve of Ali's 1965 defense of his heavyweight championship against Sonny Liston.

In 2013, Power began a three-year term as the Playwright in Residence at Dallas Theater Center through the National Playwright Residency Program, funded by the Andrew W. Mellon Foundation and administered by HowlRound. In 2016, his residency grant was renewed for another three-year term.

His play Seize the King, an adaptation of Shakespeare's Richard III premiered at La Jolla Playhouse in 2018. It was produced at the Alliance Theatre in 2020, and with the Classical Theater of Harlem, where it received strong reviews including a Critics Pick from the New York Times. Will Power's play "Detroit Red" about Malcolm X during his turbulent teenage years, played to full houses at ArtsEmerson in Boston, and received five Elliot Norton Award nominations, winning two for Outstanding New Script (Will Power) and Outstanding Actor, Large Theater (Eric Berryman). New Works also include Memnon, (Getty, Villa, Classical Theater of Harlem; as well as a "revisal" of the golden-age musical Damn Yankees, co-written with Doug Wright, which premiered at Arena Stage in September 2025. Power was a Doris Duke Foundation Resident Artist at New York Theatre Workshop, and on the Faculty at Southern Methodist University's Meadows School of the Arts.

Power is a tenured professor, and the chair of the Theater and Performance Studies Department at Occidental College in Los Angeles.

In addition to composing the music used in his shows, Power has also written lyrics and music heard on MTV, UPN's Moesha, and NBC's Kingpin. He was also the lead vocalist of the Omar Sosa Sextet from 1997 to 2000.

Power is the son of civil rights activists, Gigi Gregory and Christopher Wylie, the grandson of George Gregory, Jr., and a cousin of Congresswoman Lateefah Simon and actor Jazmyn Simon.

== Discography ==
With Midnight Voices- Albums: Dreams Keep Blowin' My Mind (1991), Late Nite at the Upper Room (1994), Howlin' at the Moon (1997).

As a member of the Omar Sosa Sextet-Free Roots (1997), Spirit of the Roots (1999), Bembón (2000), Prietos (2000).

== Theatrical works ==
Written and performed:

- 2017, Cure No Cure (1997–98)
- The Gathering (premiered 1999, toured through 2002)
- Flow (premiered 2003, toured through 2005)

Performed:

- Blessing the Boats

Written:

- Memnon
- Detroit Red
- Seize the King
- Honey Bo and the Goldmine
- Fetch Clay Make Man
- Steel Hammer (with Carl Hancock Rux, Kia Corthron, Regina Taylor, and SITI Company)
- The Seven - Composed by Will Power, Will Hammond, and Justin Ellington
- Five Fingers of Funk - Composed by Will Power and Justin Ellington
- Stagger Lee - Composed by Will Power and Justin Ellington

Adapted:

- Damn Yankees - Adapted by Will Power and Doug Wright

== Film/television appearances ==
- Drylongso (film)
- All Men Are Sons
- Last Call with Carson Daly
- Bill Moyers on Faith and Reason on PBS
- The Colbert Report
- Theatre Talk

== Published works ==
- Fetch Clay Make Man (Overlook Press, 2016)
- Theater and Cultural Politics for a New World (Routledge Press, 2016)
- Steel Hammer, Humana Festival 2014: The Complete Plays (Playscripts, Inc)
- Selection from Fetch Clay, Make Man, 2014 Monologues for Actors of Color (Routledge Press)
- Selection from Fetch Clay, Make Man, "The Best Stage Monologues of 2014) (Applause)
- Five Fingers of Funk, "Fierce and True, Plays for Teen Audiences" (University of Minnesota Press, 2010)
- Flow, "Plays from the Boom Box Galaxy: Theater from the Hip Hop Generation" (TCG, 2009)
