= Ballet Review =

- Editor and Designer: Marvin Hoshino
- Categories: Dance, ballet, modern dance, contemporary dance, criticism, interviews
- Frequency: Quarterly
- Publisher: Dance Research Foundation, Inc.
- Founded: 1965
- Final issue: 2020
- Country: United States
- Based in: New York City
- Language: English
- ISSN: 0522-0653

Ballet Review was a print publication which covered all aspects of dance. It was published by the non-profit Dance Research Foundation, Inc.

While its name says "ballet," it also covered modern dance, contemporary dance, other choreography, and all kinds of folk dance including Asian traditions. It was noted for its carefully chosen contemporary and historical photographs; in-depth interviews with dancers, choreographers, and company directors; criticism and analyses; and reports of recent performances in New York City, in world capitals, and from around America.

Arlene Croce, David Vaughan, and Robert Cornfield founded Ballet Review in 1965. Croce served as the publication's first editor. Vaughan continued to write for the magazine until 2016, and Cornfield was the magazine's second editor. In 1970 a nonprofit organization, the Dance Research Foundation, was created to oversee the publication of Ballet Review. The Foundation is also involved in research about dance and related arts. Francis Mason, co-author of Balanchine’s Complete Stories of the Great Ballets was editor from 1980 until his death in 2009.

In 2009, Marvin Hoshino, who had been the designer of Ballet Review since the 1980s, became the editor. Under Mr. Hoshino's leadership, Ballet Review expanded and in 2013 it began publishing its photographs in color. Mr. Hoshino continued to design the publication, and with his technical knowledge, astute eye, and masterful manipulation of color and tone, he firmly established Ballet Review as "The Premier Dance Journal." In May 2019, Ballet Review announced that it would be suspending publication, and in November 2019 it announced that it would be ceasing publication. Ballet Review's final (double) issue, Volume 48, Numbers 1 & 2, "Spring-Summer 2020," was published in August 2020.

== Dance Research Foundation, Inc. ==
The Dance Research Foundation, Inc. is supported in part by funds from National Endowment for the Arts, the New York State Council on the Arts, The Fan Fox and Leslie R. Samuels Foundation. The current members of the Board of Directors of the Foundation are Hubert Goldschmidt, Alan W. Kornberg, Dawn Lille, Michael Popkin, and David S. Weiss.
