= Pepón Osorio =

Puerto Rican artist (born 1955)

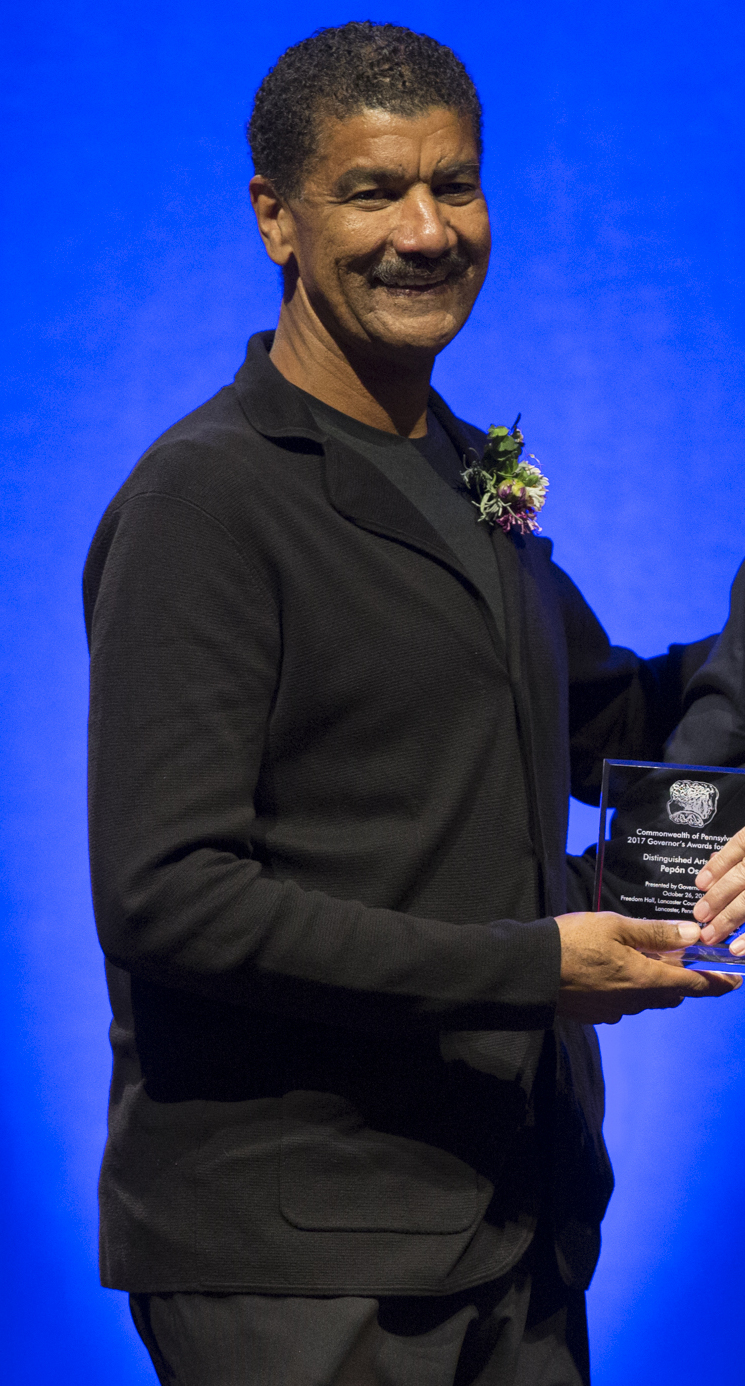
- Osorio in 2017
- Born: 1955 (age 70–71); Santurce, San Juan, Puerto Rico
- Education: Interamerican University of Puerto Rico; Lehman College; Columbia University (MA)
- Occupation: Artist
- Spouse: Merián Soto

Pepón Osorio born in Santurce, Puerto Rico in 1955 is an artist who gathers and uses objects as well as video in his pieces to portray political and social issues in the Latino community. He studied at the Interamerican University of Puerto Rico, Lehman College, and also Columbia University, where he obtained his MA in sociology in 1985. He currently resides in Philadelphia where he is an Art Education Professor at Temple University's Tyler School of Art.

His work is held by the Walker Art Center, the Smithsonian American Art Museum, Whitney Museum of American Art, El Museo del Barrio, el Museo de Arte de Puerto Rico, and by the Puerto Rico Museum of Contemporary Art. He also previously had installations displayed at the Ronald Feldman Gallery.

== Early career ==
In 1975, Osorio moved to the Bronx, New York. He began making art in 1976. In 1985, Osorio changed his artistic approach to focus more on self-identity and cultural reaffirmation. Beginning with La Bicicleta (The Bicycle, 1987), he focused on transforming ordinary inexpensive objects by adding layers of decoration—religious figures, holy cards, plastic flowers, ribbons, photographs, dolls, swans, palm trees, and other small plastic objects. For Osorio, his process as an “embelequero” is a common one among Puerto Rican people. As he says, “You re-invent with what’s there...you never accept anything as it is given to you.” For him, this additive process creates “an abundance that is not really there.” It is a way of personalizing and appropriating these inexpensive mass-produced objects.

This change in his visual vocabulary is what led him to create his important pieces of the '80s. The Bicycle was based on memories of his own bicycle and those of others he knew in Puerto Rico—his friends, the avocado vendor, and the knife sharpener. El Chandelier (1987) and its accompanying performance, No Regrets (1987), with choreographer Merián Soto, commemorates the life of a Puerto Rican woman from the Bronx. The chandelier was one of the few luxuries she could afford. La Cama (The Bed) (1987) commemorates Juana Hernández, a woman Osorio considered a second mother. Hernández had died in 1982. La Cama, which had large photographs of Soto and Osorio, was also a way of introducing Juana to Merián, whom Osorio later married. Osorio often collaborated with choreographer Soto in performances and as a set and installation designer. Osorio integrated performance and dance into his work as a way to more clearly portray the Latino body. In La Cama, there was an implied but physically absent body.

== Focusing on the AIDS pandemic ==
In 1991, Osorio created a piece inside of New York's El Museo Del Barrio called El Velorio – AIDS in the Latino Community in which 7 coffins were left to represent the victims of Puerto Rican people who died from AIDS. Each coffin was filled with information about the victims who died which included different items such as heartwarming notes from friends and family, flowers, and even a mirror which was meant to help the viewer connect more personally to the piece.

== Discovering film ==
Scene of the Crime (Whose Crime?) (1993) at the New Museum in 2023

During the 1990s, Osorio began to work with video which prompted his entrance into the mainstream art world. His two-room installation Scene of the Crime (Whose Crime?) was created for the Whitney Biennial in 1993. In this piece, there is a covered body on the living room floor that viewers are led to assume is a woman who was murdered by her husband. Surrounded by crime scene tape, the Latino domestic space is deconstructed by becoming a crime scene, as well as showing larger-than-life stereotypes about Puerto Rican culture. The living and dining rooms are filled with an overwhelming proliferation of religious figures, trophies, small framed photographs, enlarged photographs, Puerto Rican flags and souvenirs, and ads for Latino food products, along with Osorio's other embellishments. The gold silk sofa is stabbed with more than half a dozen souvenir machetes that say, "Puerto Rico." The dead body, which is hard to find in the overly-decorated living room, alludes to the way Latinos are often depicted as violent criminals in films.

The installation is framed by walls of videotapes of real Hollywood films that depict negative Latino stereotypes. On each box is a statement by someone in the Latino community whom Osorio interviewed about how they were represented in film. One person said, “We’re either seen as violent, horny, or on welfare. They show our humanity not our struggles and empowerment." The installation makes it clear that the real crime is how Puerto Ricans and Latinos are negatively depicted in mainstream films. The welcome mat in front of the installation gives a powerful statement of Osorio's intention: “...only if you can understand that it has taken years of pain to gather into our homes our most valuable possessions, but the greatest pain is to see in the movies how others make fun of the way we live."

Osorio uses film as a way to be there in the piece when he cannot physically. Osorio decided after having his work at the Whitney Biennial that he would not have any more work in mainstream art museums unless it is first shown to the Puerto Rican community. This decision was made in response to the controversy of what kind of art and which social groups could/should be shown in the museum. His focus on the Latino body did not fulfill his intentions of shedding more light upon the Puerto Rican community, although it did bring attention to his own personal work.

== Gender roles ==
In 1994, Osorio created an installation called En La Barberia, No Se Llora (No Crying In the Barbershop), which he used to explore Latino masculinity. He described the barber shop as a place where men would go on the weekends a social gathering to do business and also play dominoes, along with the practical function of a barbershop. Crying was not allowed in the barbershop as it was viewed as a feminine act, which was seen socially unacceptable in a masculine environment. Osorio had multiple men of all ages featured in the videos as a way to portray and explore the issue of machismo in the Latino community. Osorio also brought women into the video installations as a way to try and break the gender boundary of the barbershop. Sixteen video monitors were put on display showing the different men in different physical and emotional states of masculinity along with two color monitors displaying men crying without audio. The walls of the barbershop were lined with portraits of different Latino men, Benjamin Osorio (his father) being the biggest portrait.

== ReForm ==
In 2013, Philadelphia's Fairhill Elementary School was one of two-dozen schools that were forced to close by the Philadelphia School Reform Commission (PSRC) due to cuts in funding. The installation was used as a way to engage people socially with its participation from the community and beyond. Osorio's assistants, The Bobcats, planned a "Fun Day" as a way to involve the community and reconnect with each other. The expected attendance was around 200 with 800 people showing up to the event.

ReForm (2014–2017) was a collaborative installation held at the Tyler School of Art at Temple University using a multitude of objects sourced from Philadelphia's Fairhill Elementary School taken with the school districts permission. Osorio was commissioned by Temple Contemporary with support from the community (former staff, students, parents, etc.) Osorio helped create a classroom environment bringing the viewer into the now closed school. Ten students who named themselves after the Fairhill School's mascot, The Bobcat(s), assisted Osorio in his project as they shared their own experiences, and wishes of change. The installation brings focus to the Philadelphia public school system and the support and change it needs and how the system correct the wrongs previously thrown against them. ReForm consisted of video, audio, and physical material, including patterned fabric on the ceiling, backpacks, books, desks, chairs, and other assorted materials salvaged from Fairhill Elementary.

== Awards ==
- 1985 Bessie Award
- 1999 MacArthur Foundation Program
