= Merián Soto =

Puerto Rican artist

Merián Soto (born June 8, 1954, Puerto Rico) is a choreographer and performance artist. Soto is best known for her interdisciplinary solo, group and collaborative works that explore and reflect upon the legacy of colonialism and Latino heritage, history and culture. Simply, Soto creates choreographic works that intertwine improvisational movements and post-modern structures she calls “energy modes”. By means of her choreography that accesses the personal history of Puerto Ricans, expresses the experiences of Puerto Ricans, and elicits the cultural memory of Puerto Ricans, Soto attempts to “blur the line between “real” life everyday/commonplace movement/dance/performance and staged/”artistic” dance and performance.”

Soto earned a Bachelor of Arts in Dance from the Gallatin School of Individualized Study at New York University and she received a Masters of Arts in Dance Education from Teachers College, Columbia University. Soto has also studied Kinetic Awareness and Improvisation and Body and Mind movements, which influenced her work. Likewise, she has studied and practiced Yoga since 1986.

Soto is the recipient of numerous fellowships and awards including an Artist Fellowship (Gregory Millard Fellow) from the New York Foundation for the Arts in 1998; the New York Dance and Performance Award (Bessie Awards) in 2000 and the Greater Philadelphia Dance and Physical Theater Award (ROCKY) in 2008 for the One Year in Wissahickon Park Project. In 2015 she received a fellowship from the Pew Center for Arts & Heritage recognizing her 40-year career in dance performance, focusing on the body's relationship to consciousness and creating “a dance of the future, a dance of healing, transformation, and transcendence.”

Merián Soto currently resides in Philadelphia where she is an Associate Professor and the MFA Coordinator of the Department of Dance at the Boyer College of Music and Dance at Temple University.

== Career ==
Merián Soto has presented her choreography in numerous venues throughout Puerto Rico, the United States and internationally since the mid 70s. Such venues include the Whitney Museum at Philip Morris, the Institute of Contemporary Art in London, the Hostos Center for Arts and Culture, the Lincoln Center Serious Fun Festival, and the Chicago Museum of Contemporary Art.

From 1985 to 1995, Soto collaborated a great deal with MacArthur award-winning visual artist Pepon Osorio. By means of the inclusion of live music, dance, acting, slide projections, film and stage props, Soto and Osorio created interdisciplinary pieces that explored racial and sexual stereotypes and other issues in contemporary Puerto Rican reality and popular culture. Two significant collaborations of Soto and Osorio include Historias (1992), a multimedia work that addresses Puerto Rico’s history, particularly the impact of colonization, and Familias (1995), also a multimedia work that “poetically meditates on the nature of family.”

Soto and Osorio’s collaborative pieces also aim to involve the community in both process and product. The participation of eight local Bronx Latino families in the piece Familias as well as the incorporation of local artists and people into the various performances of Historias across the U.S. and internationally reflects how the involvement and participation of the community is a primary aspect in Soto and Osorio’s pieces.

Other signature works of Soto in which she collaborated with Osorio include Puerto Rican Trivia (1987); No Regrets (1988); Referencias (References) (1990) and Broken Hearts (1990).

In 1996, Soto began developing works that incorporated popular dance forms, particularly salsa, as both a theme and choreographic technique. Among these are Así se baila un Son (How to Dance a Son Montuno) (1999), Prequel(a): Deconstruction of a Passion for Salsa (2002) and La Máquina del Tiempo (The Time Machine) (2004). As of 2005 Soto branched out from post-modern, Salsa based dances and into branch dancing. Soto defines branch dancing as “a slow meditative performance practice, which involves moving into stillness, the investigation of gravity as essential force, the detailed sequencing of movement through inner pathways and dynamic shifting into balance and alignment.” In essence, Soto’s Branch Dances investigate the connections between movement, the elements, physical experience, alignment, balance, consciousness, and performance.

After having conducted numerous solo, unadvertised branch dance performances in the park, Soto embarked on the One Year Wissahickon Park Project (2007). The One Year Wissahickon Park Project is a series of 16 performances designed around the concept of four seasons, four sites and four performances in each site that took place in Philadelphia's Wissahickon Valley Park from 2007 to 2008.

Inspired and informed by her many days spent in Philadelphia's Wissahickon Park, Soto continued her Branch dance series with her most recent pieces Postcards from the Woods (2009) and Winter Dance (2010).

== Pepatián Organization ==
Merián Soto is one of the founding artistic directors, along with Pepon Osorio (visual artist) and Patti Bradshaw (choreographer/dancer), of Pepatián. Founded in 1983, Pepatián is an arts organization in the South Bronx. Pepatián is “dedicated to creating, producing and supporting contemporary multidisciplinary works by Latino and Bronx based artists”. In essence, by means of performances, workshops, residencies, arts education, mentoring projects, panels, Q&As, and other programs, Pepatián aims to reach out to Latino artists and audiences underserved by mainstream arts establishments.

In June 2000, the Bronx Council on the Arts and the Bronx Borough President acknowledged and gave Pepatián an award for “its contributions to the cultural well-being of the Bronx”.
