= Bronx Academy of Arts and Dance =

Coordinates: 40°50′18″N 73°50′40″W

- BAAD!
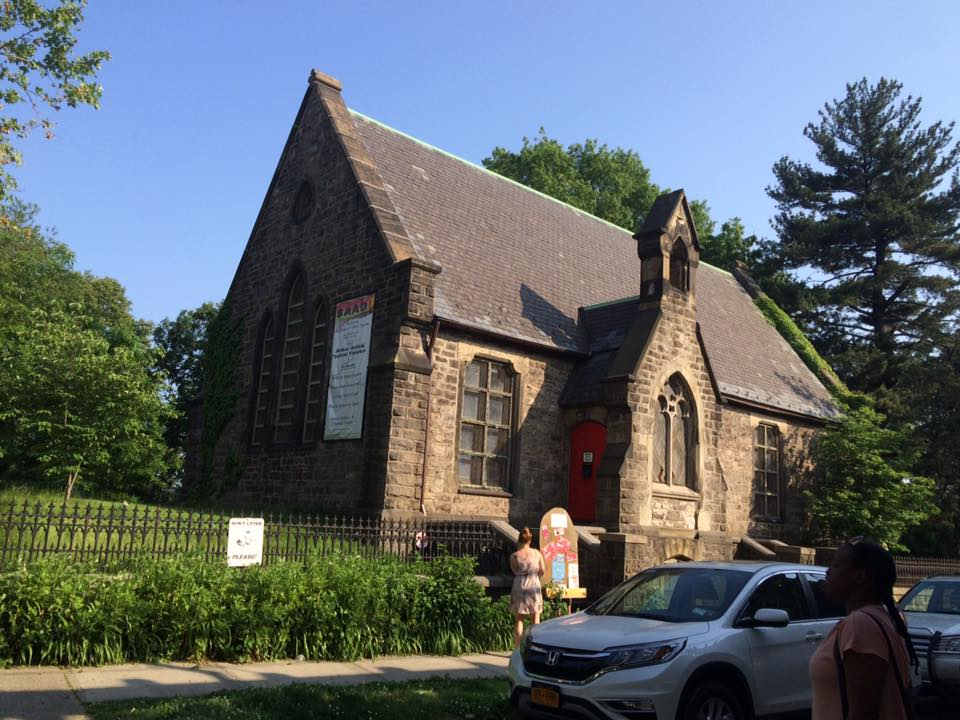
- The Academy in 2016
- Interactive map of Bronx Academy of Arts and Dance
- Address: 2474 Westchester Avenue; The Bronx, New York City; United States
- Owner: Charles Rice-Gonzales; Arthur Aviles
- Capacity: 70
- Type: Performing arts center

Construction
- Opened: 1998
- Years active: 1998 - present
- Architects: Leopold Eidlitz; Cyrus L. W. Eidlitz

Website
- http://www.baadbronx.org/

Bronx Academy of Arts and Dance, also referred to as BAAD!, is a New York performing and visual art workshop space and performance venue located in The Bronx. The Academy is home to the Arthur Aviles Typical Theatre and The Bronx Dance Coalition.

== History ==
The Bronx Academy of Arts and Dance was co-founded in 1998 by Arthur Aviles, dancer and choreographer who performed with the Bill T. Jones/Arnie Zane Dance Company, and Charles Rice-González, a writer, activist, and publicist. The Academy was first located in a community center before renting space in the historic American Bank Note Company Printing Plant in the Hunts Point neighborhood of the South Bronx and was home to the Arthur Aviles Typical Theatre, a contemporary dance company focusing on works exploring the margins of Latino and LGBTQ cultures. The programs at BAAD! were made up of dancers, LGBTQ visual artists, women, and artists of color.

Artists began presenting work in the space and hosting annual arts festivals such as BAAD! Ass Women, Out Like That!, The BlakTino Performance Series, The Boogie Down Dance Series, and the holiday play Los Nutcrackers: A Christmas Carajo. In 2010 a film event series, titled Get Tough! Get BAAD! focusing on gay-bashings in New York City, was added. Out Like That! is the Bronx's only arts and culture festival celebrating works by lesbian, gay, bisexual and transgender artists.

In 2002 the Bronx Dance Coalition, which supports professional Bronx dance and published the Bronx Dance Magazine, was formed at the Academy. Later the Muse/Artist in Residency Project was started.

After 14 years in the Bank Note Building, the Academy was forced to leave due to increasing rent. In October 2013, the Academy relocated to a gothic revivalist chapel in the cemetery on the grounds of the historic St. Peter's Episcopal Church in Westchester Square. The chapel that houses the Academy was made a New York City Landmark in 1976 and was added to the National Register of Historic Places in 1998.

In 2017 they were one of 12 grantees to receive a grant from the Lincoln Center Cultural Innovation Fund and the Rockefeller Foundation in order to "increase arts access and participation in the diverse neighborhoods of the South Bronx and Central Brooklyn". The 60K grant will be used for the Transvisionaries:Live Performance Series, a monthly free performance series featuring trans and gender non-conforming artists or color, hosted at local cafes in the South Bronx. The goal being to increase access to performance outside the theater while bringing visibility to trans people.
