= Arnie Zane =

American photographer, choreographer, and dancer

- Bill T. Jones and Zane (right) in Rotary Action (1982)
- Born: September 26, 1948; New York City, New York, U.S.
- Died: March 30, 1988 (aged 39); Valley Cottage, New York, U.S.
- Education: Binghamton University

Arnie Zane (September 26, 1948 – March 30, 1988) was an American photographer, choreographer, and dancer. He is best known as the co-founder and co-artistic director of the Bill T. Jones/Arnie Zane Dance Company.

== Early years ==
The second son of an Italian-Jewish family, Zane was born in the Bronx, New York on September 26, 1948. Zane graduated from Binghamton University (SUNY) with a degree in theater and art history. Not long afterward, Zane began pursuing an interest in photography. Though he is best known for being a dancer and choreographer, Zane began his career as a photographer. Zane was immensely interested in the human body, particularly its gestures, its movement, and its essence. Critic Jonathan Green in Continuous Replay: The Photographs of Arnie Zane has characterized Zane's portraits as “breaking down boundaries of race and age”. Zane's exploration of these themes is evidenced in his famous pictorials of a dancing Bill T. Jones. He met Jones, the man who would later become his lifelong partner, while visiting his Alma mater. The story goes that the 22-year-old Zane was immediately enamored of Bill T. Jones (a freshman studying dance and theater at SUNY) when he spied him across campus in 1971. During that spring semester, Zane convinced Jones to travel to Amsterdam with him and explore their burgeoning romantic relationship. After living and working together in Amsterdam, Zane and Jones eventually returned to New York City.

== Career ==
Zane's interest in dance began when he and Jones took Lois Welk's contact improvisation class at SUNY/Brockport. Welk's improvisational workshop stressing the physical interdependence between dancers, fascinated Zane and sparked his passion for dance. The three (Zane, Jones, Welk) collaborated and formed the American Dance Asylum which was heavily influenced by the work of experimental dancers of the time, namely Yvonne Rainer and other members of Grand Union. Zane's photographic interest in the body and his interest in visual design shaped his approach to choreography. Zane and Jones would utilize their physical differences (Zane was short and white, and moved with an agitated energy; Jones was tall and black, and moved with a generous grace) to create an image that was beautiful in its oddity. Their pieces would fuse Jones' power and grace with Zane's quick and wiry movement. Indeed, the still pictures of their dances together are especially striking and memorable.

After touring internationally for two years as a modern dance duo with the American Dance Asylum, they formed the Bill T. Jones-Arnie Zane Company in 1982. The next year, their company would appear at the Next Wave festival at the Brooklyn Academy of Music. Over the years, the Bill T. Jones-Arnie Zane company has garnered much admiration for its creation of its own brand of postmodern dance which has become known for energetic dances set to narrative texts and postmodern music.

Zane and Jones choreography often explored issues such as racism, religion, sexism, and the nuclear age. They created the trilogy Monkey Run Road, Blauvelt Mountain (both 1979), and Valley Cottage (1980) (for which Helen Thorington composed the sound scores). In 1984, Zane and Jones achieved box office success and created Secret Pastures. In Secret Pastures, Zane played a mad scientist who creates a fabricated man (Jones). Zane and Jones also collaborated on Ritual Ruckus (How to Walk an Elephant) for the Alvin Ailey American Dance Theater in 1985.

== Awards ==
Zane received his first award in the arts for photography when he received a Creative Artists Public Service (CAPS) Fellowship in 1973. He was also the recipient of a second CAPS Fellowship in 1981 for choreography, as well as two Choreographic Fellowships from the National Endowment for the Arts (1983 and 1984). In 1980, Zane was co-recipient, with Bill T. Jones, of the German Critics Award for his work, Blauvelt Mountain.

== Death ==
Zane died on March 30, 1988, at the age of 39 of AIDS-related lymphoma at his home in Valley Cottage, N.Y. Following his death, Jones choreographed Absence, a piece that evoked the memory of his late lover and partner Arnie Zane. Absence addresses the varied feelings associated with mourning. After a 1989 performance of Absence, writer Robert Jones described the piece as "a shimmering, ecstatic quality that was euphoric and almost unbearably moving." Tobi Tobias, dance critic for New York, said that the work took "its shape from Zane's special loves: still images and highly wrought, emotion-saturated vocal music."
