= New York Live Arts =

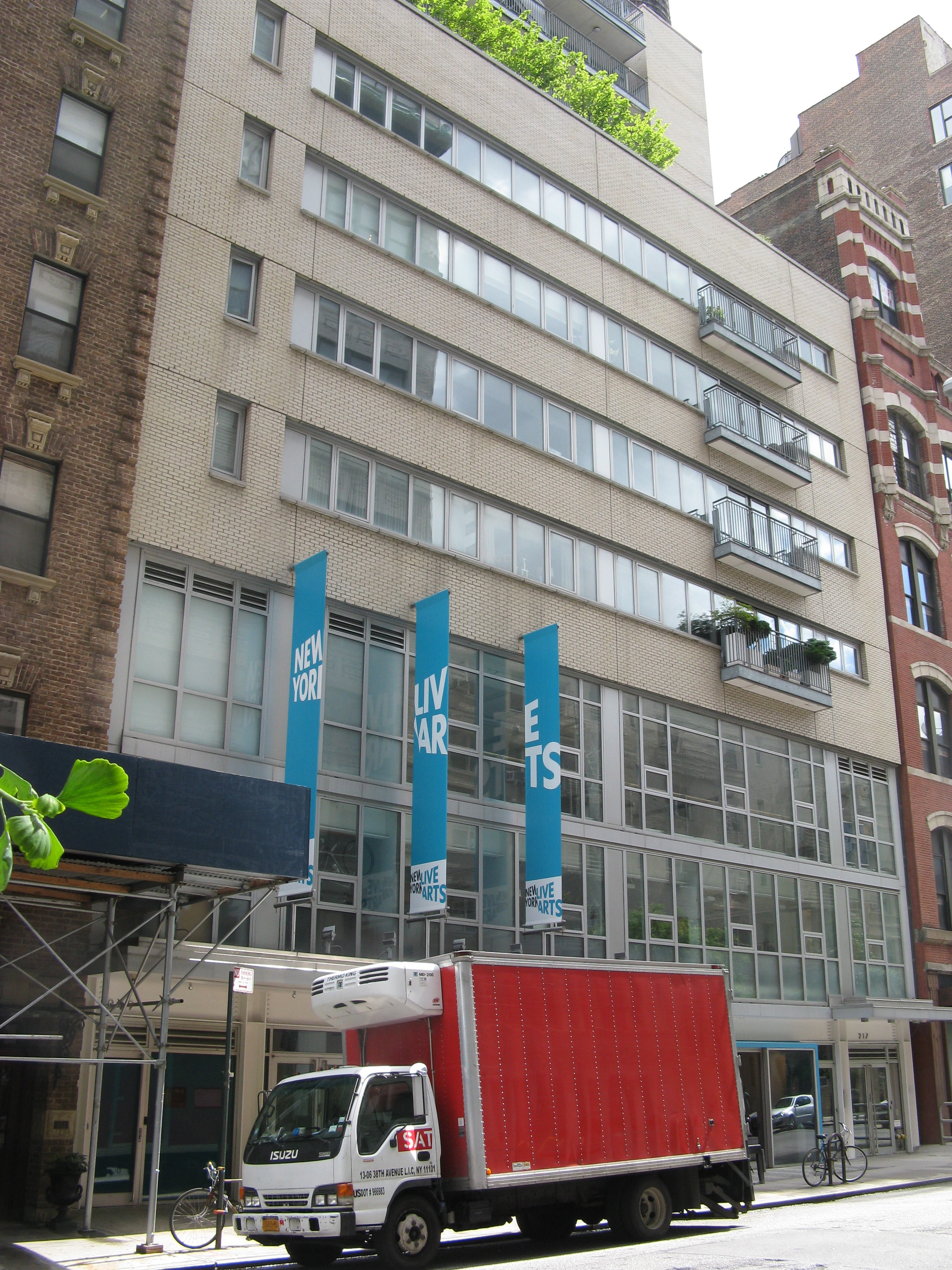
- Interactive map of New York Live Arts
- Address: 219 W 19th St; Chelsea, New York City; United States
- Coordinates: 40°44′32″N 73°59′53.7″W
- Owner: New York Live Arts
- Capacity: 184

Construction
- Opened: 2002 as Dance Theater Workshop
- Reopened: 2011 as New York Live Arts
- Architect: Edgar Rawlings

Website
- www.newyorklivearts.org

New York Live Arts (Live Arts) is a movement-focused arts organization in New York City that serves as the home of the Bill T. Jones/Arnie Zane Dance Company. The building was formerly the home of Dance Theatre Workshop, with which the Bill T. Jones/Arnie Zane Dance Company merged 2011 to form New York Live Arts.Its activities encompass commissioning, producing, and presenting works of dance, performance and music, together with allied education programming and services for artists. Live Arts is located in New York City's Chelsea neighborhood. Its building features a 184-seat theater, rehearsal studios and offices.

== History ==
New York Live Arts was created in 2011 through the merger of Dance Theater Workshop and The Bill T. Jones/Arnie Zane Dance Company. Dance Theater Workshop was struggling with operating costs related to the building it opened in 2002 and the Bill T. Jones/Arnie Zane Dance Company had been looking to establish its first studio/office facility. The latter organization had recently been advised that its bid to become a tenant of a new building in Harlem had been rejected despite its having secured commitments of $13 million in public funding to support the development of the space. News of the merger concerned the New York City contemporary dance scene. This concern was mostly addressed through a series of community discussions and board proposals that presented it as necessary for the organizations' survival. Simultaneous with the merger announcement, the two entities unveiled the New York Live Arts name, noting that the omission of the word "dance" was meant to suggest potential future directions encompassing a wider range of art forms.

== Governance and management ==
New York Live Arts is overseen by an 18-member board. Bill T. Jones serves as artistic director, supported by Associate Artistic Director Janet Wong. Kim Cullen is executive director overseeing day-to-day operations in concert with approximately 25 full-time staff members New York Live Arts' annual budget is approximately $5 million, supported by philanthropic contributions, earned income, and government support.

== Major programs ==
The Bill T. Jones/Arnie Zane Dance Company is the largest and most visible program of New York Live Arts. The company, founded in 1982, tours internationally and has long been considered a leading force in contemporary dance. It has been a primary vehicle for Bill T. Jones to realize his creative vision, and is noted for its engagement with political and social issues. The company rehearses at New York Live Arts and occasionally performs there. In addition to Bill T. Jones' programming, New York Live Arts mounts an annual season of performances at its theater that features of a range of artists and companies, presented both independently and in partnership with other organizations. These programs include: Live Ideas, a humanities festival; The Randjelovic/Stryker Resident Commissioned Artist, a two-year residency for distinguished mid-career artists; another residency program known as Live Feed; and Fresh Tracks a professional development program and showcase for early-career artists.

== Building ==
New York Live Arts occupies the basement and first three levels of an 11-story condominium tower. The basement and first level are dedicated to the 184-seat theater, lobby and supporting spaces. In the theater, a high-ceilinged black-box space with a 42 x 30 foot sprung floor abuts a steeply-raked fixed seating area on one side. The second level of the building is devoted to offices and meeting rooms. The third level features two 1,200 square-foot windowed rehearsal studios, also with sprung floors, that can be combined to create a single space.

== Selected artists and companies presented at New York Live Arts ==
- Kyle Abraham/abraham.in.motion
- Bill T. Jones/Arnie Zane Dance Company
- Trisha Brown Dance Company
- Anne Teresa De Keersmaeker
- Richard Move
- Miguel Gutierrez
- Trajal Harrell
- Meg Stuart
- John Jasperse
- Big Dance Theater
- Molissa Fenley
- Jérôme Bel
- Dianne McIntyre
- Cynthia Hopkins
- Taylor Mac
