= Charles Rice-González =

American writer

Charles Rice-González (born May 14, 1964) is an American writer, LGBTQ activist, educator, and arts administrator. He is co-founder of The Bronx Academy of Arts and Dance and an associate professor of English at Hostos Community College, part of the City University of New York. His work focuses on queer Latinx identity, Bronx cultural life, and community-based arts practice.

== Early life and education ==
Rice-González was born in Santurce, Puerto Rico, and raised in the Bronx, New York. His upbringing in a Black and Puerto Rican immigrant community in the Bronx has informed much of his literary and artistic work. He earned a Bachelor of Arts in communications from Adelphi University and a Master of Fine Arts in Creative Writing from Goddard College.

== Career ==
=== Arts and cultural leadership ===
In 1998, Rice-González co-founded The Bronx Academy of Arts and Dance, a Bronx-based cultural organization supporting artists of color and LGBTQ artists. He serves as executive director.

Earlier in his career, he worked in arts administration, marketing, and public relations, including positions with Universal Pictures and Repertorio Español. He later founded Rice-Gonzalez Public Relations, working with Latino performing arts festivals and organizations including Ballet Hispánico and the National Ballet of Cuba.

Rice-González has served as board chair of the Bronx Council on the Arts and the National Association of Latino Arts and Cultures.

=== Academic career ===
Rice-González is a faculty member at Hostos Community College, where he has served as Distinguished Lecturer, Assistant Professor, and associate professor of English. Before joining the faculty at Hostos Community College, he taught in the English Departments of LaGuardia Community College and the College of Staten Island, both in the CUNY (City University of New York) system.

== Literary and theatrical work ==
His novel Chulito (2011), set in the Hunts Point neighborhood of the Bronx, received recognition from the American Library Association, including a Stonewall Book Award honor and inclusion on the Rainbow Book List. The novel was also highlighted by the National Book Critics Circle. The book received positive reviews.

He co-edited From Macho to Mariposa: New Gay Latino Fiction (2011), an anthology of queer Latino writing. His play I Just Love Andy Gibb was published in Blacktino Queer Performance: A Critical Anthology (2016) and his play Los Nutcrackers: A Christmas Carajo has been produced annually since 2004 at BAAD! and his other work staged at venues including Pregones Theater, Gibney and PS 122.

== Selected works ==
=== Books ===
- Chulito (Magnus Books/Querelle Press 2011)
- From Macho to Mariposa: New Gay Latino Fiction (co-editor, 2011)

=== Selected shorter works ===
- "The Car Chasers of Hunts Point" (The Nation, 2013)
- "Latino/a Visibility and a Legacy of Power and Love" (QED, 2016)
- "Always and Forever, Love Alex" (When Language Broke Open: An Anthology of Queer and Trans Black Writers of Latin American Descent, 2023)
- "Tomás and Shuaib" (Huizache: The Magazine of a New America, 2023)
- "Confederate Grindr" (Obsidian Journal, 2023)
- "Deep Salvage" (The Big Other, 2022)
- "Julio's Footprints" (Aster(ix) Journal, 2022)
- "Latin Moon Daddy" (Who's Yer Daddy? Gay Writers Celebrate Their Mentors and Forerunners, 2012)
- "1986 Love Story" (Love, Christopher Street: Reflections of New York City, 2012)
- "Dos Muchachos en la Cabaña de Poe" (Los Otros Cuerpos: Antología de temática gay, lésbica, y queer desde Puerto Rico y su diáspora, 2007)

=== Drama ===
- I Just Love Andy Gibb Published in Blacktino Queer Performance: A Critical Anthology (2016)
