= Bill T. Jones/Arnie Zane Dance Company =

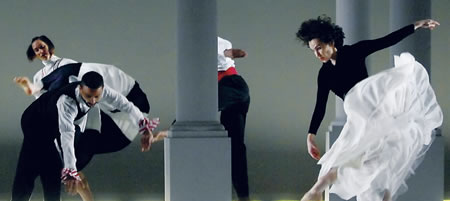
The Bill T. Jones/Arnie Zane Dance Company's performance of Another Evening: Serenade/The Proposition, a new piece by Jones on the legacy of Abraham Lincoln at the 2008 American Dance Festival.

The Bill T. Jones/Arnie Zane Dance Company is an American dance company based out of New York City. Founded in 1983 by Bill T. Jones and Arnie Zane, the company made its debut performance at the Brooklyn Academy of Music with the world premiere of Intuitive Momentum with lauded drummer Max Roach. The company has since drawn international acclaim, performing in more than 200 cities in 30 countries.

In 2011, the company merged with Dance Theater Workshop to become New York Live Arts. The move was prompted by a need for financial security, with the dance company coming in as the more financially secure organization of the two – DTW took on a considerable amount of debt in building its Doris Duke Performance Center on 19th Street, which opened in 2002. Jones, on the other hand, had been in search of a permanent venue for his company, and envisioned the Duke Performance Center becoming an arts center similar to the 92nd Street Y.

== Notable dancers ==
- Arthur Aviles, 1987–1995.
- Janet Lilly, 1983–1991.
- Lawrence Goldhuber, 1985–1995.
- Rhonda Moore, 1981–1983.
