= Mary Overlie =

American choreographer (1946–2020)

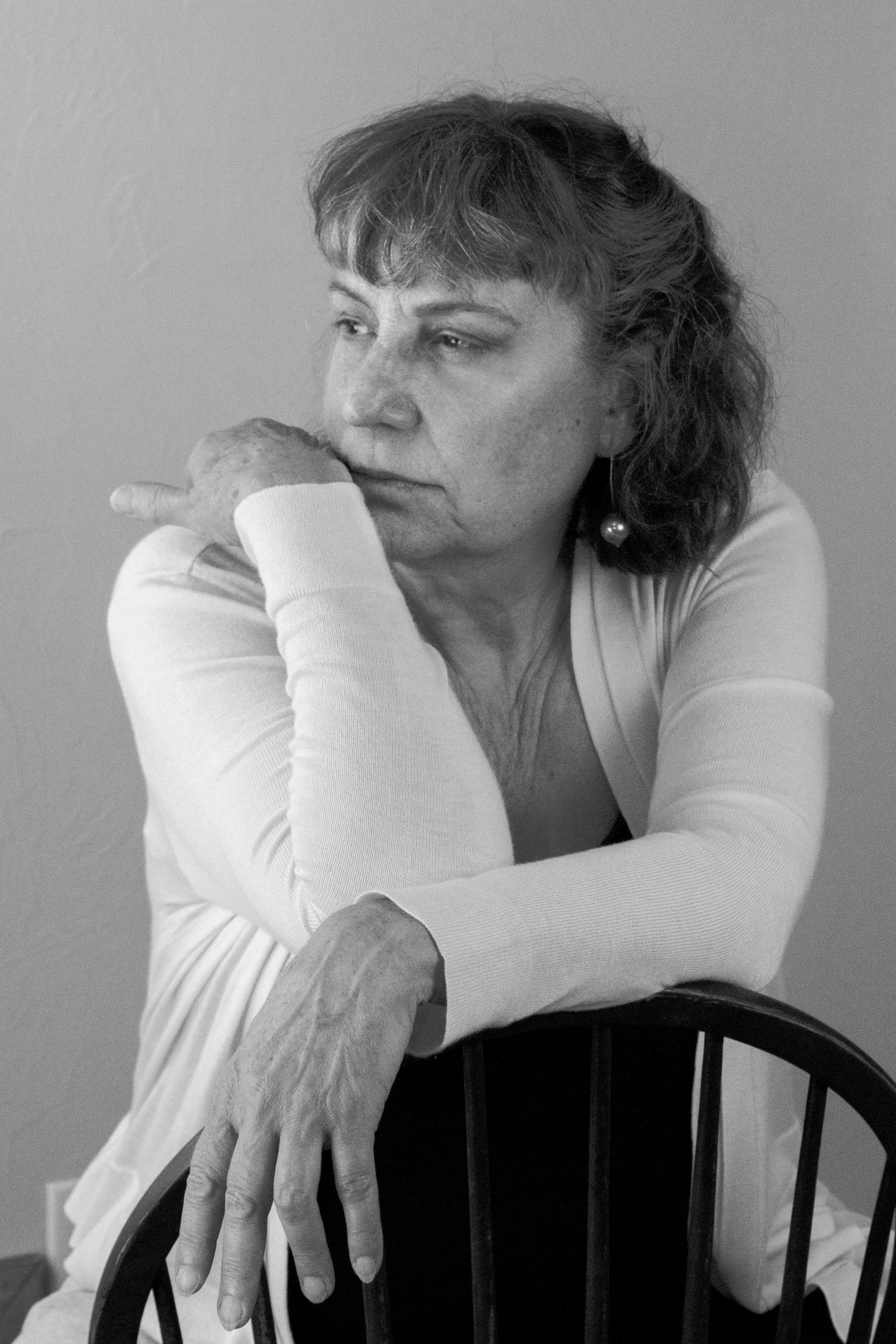
Mary Overlie 2016

Mary Overlie (January 15, 1946 – June 5, 2020) was an American choreographer, dancer, theater artist, professor, author, and the originator of the Six Viewpoints technique for theater and dance. The Six Viewpoints technique is both a philosophical articulation of postmodern performance and a teaching system addressing directing, choreographing, dancing, acting, improvisation, and performance analysis. The Six Viewpoints has been taught in the core curriculum of the Experimental Theater Wing within Tisch School of the Arts at New York University since its inception (1978).

Overlie was the co-founder of several long lasting art institutions such as Danspace Project, the Studies Project, Movement Research, and the Experimental Theater Wing at New York University.

Her choreography, both solo and for Mary Overlie Dance Company (1978-1986), has toured extensively through Europe and has been performed in New York at the Holly Solomon Gallery, The Kitchen Center for Music, Video and Dance, St. Mark's Danspace, Dance Theater Workshop, The Museum of Modern Art and numerous lofts in New York.

Overlie received two Bessie Achievement Awards, the first for creating the Studies Project, shared with Wendell Beavers, and the latter for her life-time contribution to dance.

She collaborated with Lee Breuer, JoAnne Akalaitis, David Warrilow, Ruth Maleczech, Anne Bogart, Yvonne Rainer, and Barbara Dilley.

== Life and career ==
=== 1950-1960s ===
Mary Overlie was born in Eastern Montana. She moved to Bozeman at the age of six, where she came under the influence of Gennie DeWeese (d. 2007), and Robert DeWeese (d.1990). As modernist painters, Gennie and Robert DeWeese were notable and influential members of the development of the Montana contemporary arts community, which included potters Rudy Autio and Peter Voulkos, sculptors James Reineking and Deborah Butterfield, and writer Robert Pirsig of Zen and the Art of Motorcycle Maintenance.

For Overlie, Montana's raw and minimal landscape combined with her relationship to Robert and Gennie DeWeese inspired her inquiry into the materials of performance. The question "what are dance and theater made of?", would over the years develop into the Six Viewpoints, Overlie's technical language to discuss the artistic form of performance parallel to the specific language used to describe painting.

Overlie began her dance training in ballet and improvisation with teacher Harvey Jung (former member of New York Opera Ballet Company) in Robert DeWeese's studio on Main Street in Bozeman. Throughout her teens, Overlie studied theater, dance, and visual art and immersed herself in the Montana arts community until in 1962 she moved to Berkeley, California by way of freight train.

In the Bay Area of California and at Connecticut College, Overlie studied Martha Graham technique with David Wood, Merce Cunningham technique with Margaret Jenkins, and José Limón technique with Anne Swearingen and Betty Jones. Additionally, Overlie studied Transcendental Meditation with Maharishi Mahesh Yogi, becoming a Transcendental Meditation teacher in 1968. The teachings of Transcendental Meditation would later influence the philosophical foundations of the Six Viewpoints, specifically as a process of refinement for conscious awareness

During her years in San Francisco, Overlie danced with the Anne Swearingen Dance Company, the Teresa Dickensen Dance Company, the San Francisco Mime Troupe, and the Jan Lapiner Dance Company. She later performed in works choreographed by Yvonne Rainer and Barbara Dilley, founders of the Grand Union.

=== 1970-1980s ===
In 1969, Dilley invited Overlie to make a performance for the Whitney Museum in New York City as a part of her improvisational dance company, Natural History of the American Dancer. Overlie arrived in SoHo in January 1970 while assisting Yvonne Rainer in her research and workshop tour in preparation for Rainer's film Lulu.

Overlie continued as a member of the Natural History of the American Dancer with Carmen Beauchat, Cynthia Hedstrom, Judy Padow, Rachel Lew and Suzanne Harris from 1970 to 1975. The company performed at The Whitney Museum, 112 Greene St. Gallery, Ornette Coleman's Artist's House, Paula Cooper Gallery, Bennington College, Oberlin College and other venues. In 1972, Overlie began experimenting with the early explorations of Steve Paxton, founder of Contact Improvisation. From 1975 to 1979, Overlie danced with the Judy Padow Dance Company before she started her own company and work as a soloist.

In 1974, Overlie cofounded Danspace Project, a dance-presenting organization, at St. Mark's Church in-the-Bowery with New York School poet Larry Fagin [9] and choreographer Barbara Dilley.

In 1977, Overlie choreographed and performed Window Pieces, Glassed Imaginations and Glassed Imaginations II at the Holly Solomon Gallery, 112 Greene Street, Manhattan. The pieces were performed in the storefront windows of the gallery to audiences on the sidewalk of New York's SoHo neighborhood. Ron Argelander invited her to join him as the first teacher of the Experimental Theater Wing of Tisch School of the Arts at New York University.

Sylvère Lotringer interviewed Overlie for Semiotext(e) edition Notes on the Schizo-Culture Issue (1979) alongside Jack Smith, Philip Glass, Michel Foucault, Gilles Deleuze, Robert Wilson, John Cage and other leading philosophers and artists "that had already devoted their thought to the perpetual collapsing of borders." This interview posited Overlie as notable exponent of post-modernism.

The Mary Overlie Dance Company (founded 1978), included original members Paul Langland, Wendell Beavers, and Nina Martin. The company performed Overlie's choreographies, some notable works include: Painter's Dream (1978), Hero (1979) partially scored by Laurie Anderson, History (1983) and Wallpaper (1983), all performed at The Kitchen. Adam and Eve (1983) presented at Dance Theater Workshop, and The Figure (1979) performed at the Museum of Modern Art.

In 1978, Overlie co-founded "The School for Movement Research & Construction", now Movement Research, a non-profit organization that offers dance classes, workshops, residencies and performance opportunities for artists in New York City. Its focus is on improvisation, post-modern dance, and experimentation.About Us

Seminal to Overlie's career is an enduring association with Mabou Mines Theater Company. She contributed choreography and staging for director Lee Breuer's Saint and the Football Players (1974), David Warrilow's The Lost Ones (1979), written for him by Samuel Beckett and presented at The Public Theater, and Red Beads (2000) presented at Mass MoCA. Her work with Mabou Mines also included collaborations with director JoAnne Akalaitis on the theatrical productions Cascando (1977), Dressed Like an Egg (1978), and Dead End Kids (1983) at The Public Theater.

Other notable stage collaborations included those with Anne Bogart, founder of the SITI Company, on the productions Artouist (1984) and South Pacific (1986). Via these collaborations, she introduced Bogart to the Six Viewpoints, which Bogart later adapted to design the training and directorial work of the SITI Company.

=== Late 1980s and 1990s ===
From 1984 through 1998, Overlie was working in Europe as an educator, choreographer and performer.

She was the director of the Experimental Theater Wing Paris program from 1985 to 1987 and by invitation oversaw the creation of the Pro Series Internationale Tanz Wochen Wien in Vienna, Austria (1989) where she met and organized workshops taught by Susanne Linke, Karine Saporta, Ismael Ivo, and Merce Cunningham among others. The Pro Series, now called ImPulsTanz Festival, invites world-renowned choreographers to teach workshops and choreograph experimental works in progress on students of the Internationale Tanz Wochen Wien.

She was a resident choreographer at ETW Paris, where she developed Skies over America (1986) and at the European Dance Development Center in Arnhem, Holland, where she developed Country (1992) and Dances for Prepared Bodies (1996). She toured performing her solo-pieces Small Dance (1989), History (1997), and Location of Love (1998), and worked as a freelance teacher in France, Germany, Italy, Denmark, Austria, and the Netherlands.

Overlie continued to perform in New York in an improvisation ensemble alongside Wendell Beavers and Paul Langland. They performed their work at Danspace, St. Mark's Church, New York Judson Church, Columbia University, Simone Forti Studio, Francis Alenikoff Studio, and Eden's Expressway among others from 1987 to 2001. Some of their works include: No Angels, No Apes (1993), Wallpaper (1999) and Rooms and Buildings (2001).

Overlie was awarded the 1999 Bessie Achievement Award, for her lifetime contribution to dance, "For a pallet-and-knife architecture of the choreographic canvas, a Sustained Achievement in luminous formalism concerning the body's place in time and space, a stillness drawn by the eye around the moving form, as elegantly represented in Small Dance / Locations of Love".

=== 2000s ===
In January 1998, a national conference on the Viewpoints was held in New York, sponsored by New York University, Pace University and Stage Directors and Choreographer Foundation.

Overlie founded the Six Viewpoints Studio at Tisch School for the Arts in 2006 and continued teaching at The Experimental Theater Wing until 2015 when she retired and moved to Bozeman, Montana.

=== 2010s ===
After twenty years of working on the manuscript for the Six Viewpoints, Overlie completed and self-published Standing in Space: Six Viewpoints Theory and Practice in 2016. She resided in Bozeman, Montana, taught workshops in America and Europe and was organizing an advanced Six Viewpoints School.

== The Six Viewpoints ==
=== Introduction and overview ===
The Six Viewpoints is a philosophical and practical approach to articulate a post-modern perspective on performance. The practice involves deconstructing the physical stage and physical performance into its six Materials of composition: Space, Shape, Time, Emotion, Movement and Story. These six elements have existed historically within a rigid hierarchy which gives prevalence to story and emotion in theatre, and shape and movement in dance. The Six Viewpoints releases the Materials from this fixed construct into a fluid non-hierarchical environment for re-examination. The act of deconstructing performance into its six materials invites the performer, director, artist to engage with the individual materials "allowing these elements to take the lead in a creative dialogue".

For Overlie, this shift in attention re-defines art and the role of the artist from a "creator/originator" mindset to what she called the "observer/participant", which centers on "witnessing, and interacting, ... working under the supposition that structure could be discerned rather than imposed". Overlie observed this redefinition of the artist's endeavor to correspond with the artistic shift from modernism to post-modernism.

The theory and practice of the Six Viewpoints are organized in two parts: The Materials and The Bridge.

=== The Materials (SSTEMS) ===
When working with the materials, the artist is instructed to turn off the impulse to control or own the material, and is challenged to work very specifically with each material as an independent entity. Overlie recommends the artist to gather as much "useless" data as they can and to take time to explore.

The seed of the entire work of The Six Viewpoints is found in the simple act of standing in space. From this perspective the artist is invited to read and be educated by the lexicon of daily experience. The information of space, the experience of time, the familiarity of shapes, the qualities and rules of kinetics in movement, the ways of logic, how stories are formed, the states of being and emotional exchanges that constitute the process of communication between living creatures ... Working directly with these materials the artist begins to learn of performance through the essential languages as an independent intelligence (Overlie).

The six materials of composition, referred to with the acronym SSTEMS, are:

S (Space)
Space contains blocking, placement of furniture, placement of the walls, doors and windows, angle of gaze, distance of projection, and spatial alignment of the actors to the proscenium, to the audience and to each other.
S (Shape)
Shape contains geometry, costumes, gestures, and the shape of the actors' bodies and of all the objects onstage.
T (Time)
Time contains duration, rhythm, punctuation, pattern, impulse, repetition, legato, pizzicato, lyrical.
E (Emotion)
Emotion contains presence, anger, laughter, pensiveness, empathy, alienation, romance, pity, fear, anticipation, etc.
M (Movement)
Movement contains falling, walking, running, blood pumping, breath, suspension, contraction, impact.
S (Story)
Story contains logic, order and progression of information, memory, projection, conclusion, allusions, truth, lies, associations, influences, power, weakness, reification, un-reification, constructions and deconstruction.

=== The Bridge ===
The Bridge is a sequence of nine laboratories that function as philosophical and pedagogical frameworks in which to engage with the materials. The Bridge presents the origins of the Viewpoints' approach to art and introduces into practice the philosophical concepts that are used to disintegrate and then reintegrate performance.

The nine laboratories of The Bridge are:

- News of a Difference, Noticing Difference in Increasing Levels of Subtlety
- Deconstruction, Investigating Theater by Separating the Components of its Structure
- The Horizontal, Nonhierarchical Composition
- Post-modernism, The Philosophical Foundation
- Reification, A Reflection on Creativity, Communication, and Language
- The Piano, The Interface between Artist and Audience
- The Matrix, The Ingredients are in the Cauldron
- Doing the Unnecessary, The SSTEMS Dissolve
- The Original Anarchist, A New and a Very Old Idea

As a practice at large, The Six Viewpoints "is dedicated to reading the stage as a force of Nature"

== Works ==
=== Choreography ===
- 2012 Basin Arts Refuge. Basin Montana - "The Bunny Tail Range"
- 2009 New Museum, New York Movement Research Spring Festival 2009: "Fellini World"
- 1998 NYU/Tisch Theater, New York - "We Have Nothing To Say and We Are Saying It"
- 1998 Danspace at St. Mark's Church, New York - "Location Of Love"
- 1998 Burgh Theater, Vienna - "Location of Love"
- 1997 Concert Hall, Arnhem - "Remake of History"
- 1996 EDDC, Arnhem and a tour of Germany - "Dances For Prepared Bodies"
- 1995 Eden's Express Way, New York - "No Angels No Apes", "Glassed Imaginations"
- 1992 EDDC, Arnhem - "Country"
- 1990 The Kitchen, New York - "Flight of Desire"
- 1989 International Tanz Wochen Wien - "Small Dance II"
- 1988 The Kitchen Center, New York - "Blind Bird Box Dance", "The Muses"
- 1987 Outdoor Montana - "Prairie Dance"
- 1987 Outdoor Paris - improvisation ensemble
- 1987 Experimental Theater Wing, Paris - "The Restaurant"
- 1986 Espace Kiron, Paris - Solo Repertory, "Skies over America"
- 1984 Danspace, St. Mark's Church, New York - "Small Dance", "Richard Serra Dance", "Tap Dance"
- 1983 American Center, Paris - Repertory
- 1983 The Kitchen Center, New York - "Hero II", "History", "Wallpaper II"
- 1981 Dance Theater Workshop, New York - "Adam and Eve"
- 1980 Vehicle Gallery, Montreal - "Swan Literary Duet"
- 1980 New York University, New York - "Wallpaper", "Paper Waltz"
- 1979 Museum of Modern Art, New York - "The Figure II"
- 1979 The Kitchen Center, New York - "Hero"
- 1978 Museum of Modern Art, New York - "The Figure"
- 1978 The Kitchen Center, New York - Painters Dream"
- 1977 Bunch Festival, Intermedia Theater, New York - "Possibility of Personal Failure", "Flower Garden"
- 1977 Robert Freidus Gallery, New York - "Cartoon Coordinations"
- 1977 Holly Solomon Gallery, New York - "Window Pieces", "Glassed Imaginations II", "Glassed Imaginations"
- 1976 St. Mark's Church, New York - "Adam", "To Be Announced", "Wash", "Small Dance"
- 1972 Berkeley Art Museum, Berkeley - "Free Delivery"

=== Collaboration / dance ===
- 1993- 2001 Wendell Beavers, Paul Langland; Danspace, St. Mark's Church, New York Judson Church, Columbia University, Simon Forti Studio, Francis Alenikoff Studio
- 1993 Cathy Weiss; European Dance Development Center, Arnhem - Video Dance Project
- 1993 Wendell Beavers, Paul Langland; Eden's Expressway, New York - Improvisation
- 1988 Paul Langland; Performance Festival School for New Dance Development, Amsterdam - "Coffee" Paul Langland
- 1988 Wendell Beavers, Paul Langland; Performance Festival School for New Dance Development, Amsterdam - Improvisation
- 1979 Contact Community; St. Mark's Church, New York - Contact Concert
- 1977 Daniel Lepkoff, Christine Svane, members of the Contact community; Paula Cooper Gallery, New York - Improvisation, Contact Concert, "Where", "With Whom"
- 1974 The Natural History; St. Mark's Church, New York - Improvisation
- 1974 Rachel Lew, Cynthia Hedstrom; Artists House, New York - "Falling"
- 1973 The Natural History; Artists House, New York - Improvisation
- 1973 The Natural History; Emma Willard School, New York - Improvisation
- 1973 The Natural History; Rutgers University, New Brunswick - Improvisation
- 1973 The Natural History; Dance Circle, Boston - Improvisation
- 1972 Jani Novak; The Fire House, San Francisco - "Mabeline"
- 1972 The Natural History; The Whitney Museum, New York - Improvisation
- 1972 The Natural History; Bennington College, Bennington - Improvisation
- 1972 The Natural History; Kirkland Art Centre, New York - Improvisation
- 1972 Lincoln Scott; PLACE, New York - "Raft"
- 1972 Grand Union Performance; 122, Green St. Gallery, New York
- 1971 Steve Paxton, Nancy Stark Smith; Castelli Gallery, New York - First Contact Concert

=== Collaboration / theater ===
- 1999-2000 Lee Breuer, Mass Moca; Massachusetts - "Red Beads"
- 1986 Anne Bogart; New York University, New York - "South Pacific": Bessie Award
- 1985 Lawrence Sacrow; Lama, New York - "Madness of the Day" *
- 1984 Anne Bogart; on location in New York City - "Artouist"
- 1983 JoAnne Akalaitis; Public Theater, New York - "Dead End Kids" *
- 1979 Lee Breuer, David Warrilow; Public Theater, New York - "The Lost Ones"
- 1978 Joanne Akalaitis; Public Theater, New York - "Dressed Like An Egg" *
- 1977 Joanne Akalaitis; Public Theater, New York - "Cascando"
- 1975 Lee Breuer, Mabou Mines; Connecticut College, New London - "Saint and the Football Players" *

*These productions were awarded Obie Awards

== Awards and honors ==
- 1998 Bessie Achievement Award, for lifetime contribution to dance
- 1995 Arnhem City Council Grant, "On Site Arnhem"
- 1989 Danish Cultural Ministry, "Project Grant"
- 1986 NEA/Dance, choreographic fellowship grant
- 1984 Bessie Achievement Award, for creation of the Studies Project of Movement Research
- 1979 Caps Grant

== Publications ==
- 1980. Mary Overlie: A Letter. Dance Scope 14 (4):30-34.
- 1998. The Six View Points Theory. The Journal for Stage Directors & Choreographers 12 (1):38.
- 2006. The Six Viewpoints. In Training of the American actor, edited by Arthur Bartow, 187-221. New York: Theatre Communications Group.
- 2008. Shaping the Independent Actor. In American Theatre, edited by Ellen Orensetin.
- 2016. Standing in Space: The Six Viewpoints Theory & Practice. Billings, MT: Self-published.

== See also ==
- Philip Glass
- Lee Breuer
- Movement Research
- Genevieve and Robert Deweese
- Laurie Anderson
- Mabou Mines
- Grand Union
- Steve Paxton
- Contact Improvisation
- Danspace
- Sylvère Lotringer
