= Barbara Dilley =

American dancer and artist (born 1938)

- Born: Barbara Lloyd; 1938 (age 87–88); Chicago, Illinois, U.S.
- Education: Mount Holyoke College (BA)
- Occupations: Dancer; choreographer; performance artist; educator
- Years active: 1960s–present
- Employer: Naropa University
- Known for: Merce Cunningham Dance Company, The Grand Union
- Title: President of Naropa University
- Term: 1985–1993

Barbara Dilley (Lloyd) (born 1938) is an American dancer, performance artist, improvisor, choreographer and educator, best known for her work as a prominent member of the Merce Cunningham Dance Company (1963–1968), and then with the groundbreaking dance and performance ensemble The Grand Union, from 1969 to 1976. She has taught movement and dance at Naropa University in Boulder, Colorado, since 1974, developing a pedagogy that emphasizes what she calls “embodied awareness,” an approach that combines dance and movement studies with meditation, “mind training” and improvisational composition. She served as the president of Naropa University from 1985 to 1993.

== Early life and education ==
Barbara Dilley was born in Chicago, Illinois in 1938. She began dancing early in childhood and by the age of ten was studying with Audrée Estey, who was the founder of the American Repertory Ballet and Princeton Ballet Academy. After high school, Dilley attended classes at the Jacob’s Pillow dance festival before enrolling at Mount Holyoke College in South Hadley, Massachusetts, in 1956. She received a BA from Mount. Holyoke in 1960.

== Professional career ==
Dilley first came into contact with Merce Cunningham in 1960, while participating in the Connecticut College School of Dance's annual workshop, where the renowned choreographer was in residence with his company. Cunningham asked Dilley to join his company in 1962, but due to a pregnancy she was not actually to join the company until 1963. Dilley was a key member of the Cunningham Dance Company during a very important period for Cunningham, and an exciting time for American dance. While in New York, Dilley was also active with the Judson Dance Theater, and participated in a number of performances, including Steve Paxton’s Afternoon (a forest concert), performed in the October of 1963 in Berkeley Heights, New Jersey, in a wooded location near the home of Billy Klüver.

In 1964, Dilley took part in the Cunningham Dance Company's first world tour, with stops in Venice, Paris, London, several cities in India, Bangkok and Tokyo, among other places. Cunningham’s 1964 tour featured music by John Cage and David Tudor, sets and costumes by Robert Rauschenberg, and a large number of Judson dancers, including Dilley, Paxton William Davis, Deborah Hay, Sandra Neels, and Albert Reid, as well as Alex Hay, who was hired to assist Rauschenberg with set and costume design. Their temporary exodus from New York was one among a number of factors that led to the decline and dissolution of the Judson Dance Theater.

In 1968 Dilley danced in the Cunningham company’s tour of Latin America, which included performances in Mexico City, Caracas, Rio de Janeiro and Buenos Aires.

In 1969, Dilley performed as a member of the “Rainer Dance Group” in Yvonne Rainer’s groundbreaking, improvisational Continuous Project - Altered Daily alongside Rainer, Paxton, Becky Arnold, Douglas Dunn and David Gordon. This group of dancers formed the core of an ensemble of improvising dancers that came to be known as The Grand Union, a group that also came to include Trisha Brown. The Grand Union toured extensively in the early 1970s; while in the group Dilley performed pieces by other members as well as her own works, including “The Sapsuckersummer Dance” series at Cornell Summer Dance Group in 1970, “Wonder Dances” (1975) and “To the Golden Gate Bridge” from her dance series “Coast” (1968-1971).

In 1972, Dilley founded her own improvisational dance company, an all woman group called The Natural History of The American Dancer including Carmen Beauchat, Cynthia Hedstrom, Judy Padow, Mary Overlie, Rachel Lew and Suzanne Harris. They performed at the Whitney Museum on April 29, 1972 as well as at Bennington College, Oberlin College and other venues. That same year, Dilley participated in the first public performance of Contact Improvisation at the Weber Gallery with Steve Paxton. In 1974, Dilley cofounded Danspace Project at St. Mark's Church in-the-Bowery with New York School poet Larry Fagin and choreographer Mary Overlie. Also in 1974, Tom Hast, who had seen the Whitney performance and danced with Dilley in the Weber Gallery performance, invited her to teach at the first summer session of the Naropa Institute in Boulder, Colorado, at the conclusion of which she was put in charge of designing a dance and movement program for the institute. She has remained involved with Naropa as director of the dance department (1974-1985), and president (1985-1993) since that time, and has maintained a busy schedule teaching and performing throughout the US and Europe. She is currently a professor of Contemporary Performance in Naropa University’s School of the Arts department.
