= Nina Martin (dancer) =

American choreographer, dancer, and pedagogue

Nina Martin is an American choreographer, dancer, and pedagogue. Originally from Austin, Texas, Martin moved to New York City, where she lived for 17 years. She currently resides in Fort Worth, Texas.

== Career ==
While in New York City, she was very active in the downtown dance scene. She performed with notable dance-makers Mary Overlie, David Gordon, Deborah Hay, and Martha Clarke. In 1980, Martin performed contact improvisation with Lisa Nelson, Nancy Stark Smith, Daniel Lepkoff, Randy Warshaw, and Steve Paxton as part of the program Beyond the Mainstream, a program of WNET.

Martin, along with Paul Langland, Diane Madden, Stephen Petronio, Lepkoff, Warshaw, and Robin Feld formed Channel Z, a performance collective that was active from 1982-1987. Martin also exhibited her own choreographies while living in New York City such as Changing Face, Copyright, Date with Fate, and On the Other Hand

In 1994, Martin relocated to San Diego, where she formed the performance collective, Lower Left, with Jane Blount, Mary Reich, and Karen Schaffman. They were the collective in residence at Sushi Performance and Visual Art for several years. While in residence, Martin along with her colleagues created Horns Wings More Tales among other performances.

Martin initiated research into Ensemble Thinking in the mid 1990's. Ensemble Thinking is set of movement training scores that draws dancers' attention to compositional forms. Ensemble Thinking trains the improvising dancer to be able to shift fluidly among solo, group and contact-improvisation compositional awarenesses, and also deal with the complexity that often arises in improvised group dances.

== Teaching ==
Martin has taught at dance festivals and studios throughout Europe, such as Impulstanz in Vienna, the International Contact festival Freiburg, and Tanzfabrik in Berlin.

She has taught at NYU’s Experimental Theater Wing, University of California San Diego, University of California Los Angeles, among other institutions. Currently she in on faculty at Texas Christian University
