= Jonathan Burrows =

British choreographer

Jonathan Burrows is a British choreographer.

He started his career as a soloist with The Royal Ballet in London, but formed the Jonathan Burrows Group in 1988 to present his own work.

The company travelled widely and gained an international reputation with pieces such as Stoics (1991), Very (1992), Our (1994), The Stop Quartet (1996) and Things I Don't Know (1997).

Since 2000, Burrows has worked with other performers, notably non-dancers. In 2001 he presented Weak Dance Strong Questions (2001), a collaboration with the Dutch theatre director Jan Ritsema. This was followed with the trilogy, Both Sitting Duet (2002), The Quiet Dance (2005) and Speaking Dance (2006) with the Italian composer and long-time collaborator Matteo Fargion.

Other high-profile collaborators include Sylvie Guillem's performance of his choreography in Adam Robert's film Blue Yellow in 1996, and his invitation in 1997 to choreograph for William Forsythe's Ballet Frankfurt.

In 2003 Burrows and Matteo Fargion received the 2003–2004 New York Dance and Performance Bessie Awards for Both Sitting Duet. Burrows received a 2002 Foundation for Contemporary Arts Grants to Artists Award.

Burrows has commented that it is sometimes difficult making dance in his home country of Britain, and that in Europe he finds a much more appreciative and open-minded dance and theatre industry.

Burrows has devoted fan-base among the (mostly young) dance in-crowd.

He currently lives in London and Brussels.

== Biography ==
Born in Bishop Auckland, County Durham, England, in 1960, Burrows studied at the Royal Ballet School, both White Lodge, Richmond Park and Baron's Court venues, London, 1970–79, under Richard Gladstone. He was the winner of an Ursula Morton award for student piece of choreography, 3 Solos.

From 1979 to 1991, he was a soloist with the Royal Ballet, at the Royal Opera House, Covent Garden, London, and was a performer with the Rosemary Butcher Dance Company between 1986 and 99.

He choreographed early pieces for Extemporary Dance Theatre, Spiral Dance Company, Sadler's Wells Royal Ballet, and the Royal Ballet Choreographic Group.He also made experimental work at Riverside Studios in his early career.

In 1988, he founded the Jonathan Burrows Group, which became a resident company at The Place Theatre, London, 1992–94. In 1995–96, Burrows entered into co-productions with theatres in Ghent (Belgium), Angers (France), and Utrecht (Netherlands), and in 1997 he choreographed for William Forsythe's Ballet Frankfurt.

He was artist-in-residence at Southbank Centre, London (1998–99), associate artist at Kunstencentrum Vooruit in Ghent, Belgium (1992–2002), and a visiting member of faculty at the Performing Arts Research and Training Studios (P.A.R.T.S), the school of Anne Teresa De Keersmaeker in Brussels, 1999–2002.

Burrows and Matteo Fargion received the New York Dance and Performance Bessie Awards for Both Sitting Duet, 2004. Associate Director on Peter Handke's The Hour We Knew Nothing of Each Other for the National Theatre, London, 2008.

He is Visiting Professor for the Department of Drama and Theatre at the Royal Holloway, University of London.

== Dance works ==
- Catch (mus. Douglas Gould, 1980);
- Listen (1980);
- Cloister (mus. Edward Lambert, 1982);
- The Winter Play (mus. Dudley Simpson, 1983);
- Hymns, Parts 1–3 (1985);
- Squash (mus. Nicholas Wilson, 1985);
- Hymns (1986);
- A Tremulous Heart Requires (mus. Nicholas Wilson, 1986);
- Hymns: Complete Version (1988);
- dull morning, cloudy mild (mus. Matteo Fargion, 1989);
- Stoics (mus. Matteo Fargion, Mendelssohn, 1991);
- Very (mus. Matteo Fargion, 1992);
- Our (mus. Matteo Fargion, 1994, film version, dir. Adam Roberts, same year);
- The Stop Quartet (mus. Kevin Volans, Matteo Fargion, 1996);
- Walking /music (commissioned by William Forsythe for Ballett Frankfurt, mus. Kevin Volans, 1997);
- Quintet (mus. and text Tom Johnson, 1997);
- Things I Don't Know (mus. Kevin Volans) (1997);
- Singing (1998);
- Weak Dance, Strong Questions (collaboration with the Dutch theatre director Jan Ritsema, 2001);
- Both Sitting Duet (collaboration and mus. Matteo Fargion, 2002);
- The Quiet Dance (collaboration and mus. Matteo Fargion, 2005);
- Speaking Dance (collaboration and mus. Matteo Fargion, 2006);
- Both Sitting Duet, The Quiet Dance, Speaking Dance, performed together as the Three Duets (2007).

== About the work – the Three Duets ==
Burrows and Fargion are among the most widely travelled of UK performance artists and have gained an international reputation for the intelligence, humour and musicality of their shows.

=== Both Sitting Duet (2002) ===
Sitting on chairs drawn up close to the audience, staring at music and dance "scores" at their feet, the two men draw us into a silent, unexpected and often funny conversation for two pairs of arms.

"Working mute, without instruments and almost without technique, the men become immersed in what are basically a series of brisk hand-jives. They barely rise out of their chairs as they perform. But the point of the duet is that they are able to magic their restricted vocabulary into sophisticated dance and music, twisting simple gestures into a variety of shapes and rhythms so that they mesmerise and dazzle."

"Sometimes imitative, sometimes in counterpoint, they weave a complex, witty, rhythmic tapestry, two strange characters entirely lost in obsessive movement."

The judges of the New York Dance and Performance Bessies awarded the 2003 prize, "For an extraordinary symphony of upper body gestures performed in extrasensory collaboration in an ordinary setting made tense by the silent musical score, for an intimate production by an unlikely pair of average middle-aged white guys in chairs."

Supported by the Arts Council England, the Jonathan Burrows Group, NOTT Dance Festival, Kaaitheater, P.A.R.T.S./Rosas and the Laban Dance Centre London.

=== The Quiet Dance (2005) ===
At the heart of this work is a love of rhythmic form and the quiet intensity of communication this allows them to share with each other and with the audience.

"The duo rob themselves not only of conventional music, but also of grace. It begins with the deadpan Fargion bellowing "Ahhhhhhhhhh!" as Burrows stomps across the stage, sinking lower with each step. Then the roles switch, the stomp turns into an angular stagger, and so on. Like all good comedy, it's impeccably timed – and, of course, it's not really that "quiet" at all."

"During one section, they riff on the verbal shorthand of different dance genres (ballroom, ballet and disco), and we can almost see them partnering each other on a real-life dance floor."

Co-produced by Dance 4, Nottingham, Dance Umbrella London, Joint Adventures, Munich, Kaaitheater, Brussels and supported by Arts Council England and the Jonathan Burrows Group.

=== Speaking Dance (2006) ===
Burrows' and Fargion's final part of the trilogy of performances. The last piece continues their exploration into how the relationship between music and dance is perceived, and the fragile but permeable boundaries between the two.

"As the title suggests, words are the thing here, but not in any conventional sense. There is, at last, music of many kinds, but, rather than move to it, Burrows and Fargion often read out dance notation ("Cross! Two, three, four…") or the actual names of the notes ("A! B flat! D!") in time to it." The Telegraph

Co-produced by Dance Umbrella, London, supported by the Arts Council England & the Jonathan Burrows Group and with thanks to Dance 4 Nottingham.

== Reviews ==
- "A surprisingly endearing conceptual comedy of such unpretentious charm that it seals Burrows and Fargion's status as a sort of Laurel and Hardy of the avant-garde." The Times (The Quiet Dance).
- "Jonathan Burrows is Britain's Columbus, dance's explorer, a man in quest of new lands and unknown territory.... He is a true original." The Financial Times (The Quiet Dance).
- "If Einstein ever pondered on dance, the dance in question would have looked something like the work of Jonathan Burrows." The Guardian
- "When composer Matteo Fargion and dancer Jonathan Burrows perform together, they are like two middle-aged boffins retreating into a garden shed. Both men are in their mid-40s, balding and dressed for comfort rather than style; when they collaborate on stage, they could almost be following an obsessively drawn up list of tasks – phrases of material to be analysed, details of performance to be perfected, ideas to ponder. Like all the best boffins, Burrows and Fargion mix their idiosyncrasies with passion and a kind of genius. The joy of these duets is that they deliver dance and music in ways we never expect." The Guardian, 8 January (Three Duets).
- "Absurdist self-indulgence you'll be thinking, but what you see is revelation and joy."
- "Several times during their opening performance at Sadler's Wells, on Friday evening, Jonathan Burrows and Matteo Fargion almost reduced each other to fits of giggles. And these were among the loveliest moments. Timing being the secret of comedy, and them both having an acute sense of humour, their creation is as much like very clever vaudeville as high art, a brilliantly precise device constructed to amuse and satisfy, performed by a double act as cherishable as Laurel and Hardy or Morecambe and Wise." The Telegraph, 8 January (Three Duets).
- One of the funniest and most ingenious dances seen in New York in a long time." The New York Times (Both Sitting Duet).

== Influences and influenced ==
The critic Judith Mackrell has described aspects of Burrows' style as emanating from the influences of folk-dance, classicism and more weighted postmodern dance movement.

Burrows describes Riverside Studios, run by David Gothard as influential in his early career. Gothard drew together important artists and Burrows would see Samuel Beckett and Dario Fo around the theatre, and John Cage and Merce Cunningham duets were performed there. After seeing them in the early 1980s, American post modern dance, especially the Judson Church generation of choreographers from New York, such as David Gordon, Steve Paxton, Trisha Brown, and Lucinda Childs and also Douglas Dunn and their Contact improvisation began to influence his thinking. He also began performing for Rosemary Butcher.

He also lists Bronislava Nijinska, specifically Les Noces.

Burrows' long-time collaborator Matteo Fargion studied composition with the composer Kevin Volans. Burrows consequently chose also to study with Volans, and the ideas which came out of this time are still important to Burrows' work, and a source of connection between Burrows and Fargion. Both Sitting Duet is the translation of a score of a piece of music by American composer Morton Feldman, an important figure in music, and with whom Volans was friends.

Burrows learnt traditional English Morris dancing at White Lodge Royal Ballet School, and both he and critics have named this as another possible source of influence in his style. Burrows has commented that he looked for a new way of moving that he could manage better than ballet. He met this desire in contact improvisation and release work, but also in folk dances, such as the Bampton Dancers of Oxford. Burrows comments, "I like the traditional men's dances from England. The dancers had this weird quality of absurdity mixed with profound dignity."

Burrows has through his work and teaching and mentoring, been an influence on other successful choreographers.

== Film works ==
- Very (film, dir. Adam Roberts, mus. Matteo Fargion, 1993);
- Our (film, dir. Adam Roberts, mus. Matteo Fargion, 1994);
- Hands (film, dir. Adam Roberts, music Matteo Fargion, BBC/ACE, 1995);
- blue yellow (film, solo Sylvie Guillem, dir. Adam Roberts, mus. Kevin Volans, France 2/BBC, 1995);
- The Stop Quartet (film, dir. Adam Roberts, mus. Kevin Volans, Matteo Fargion, 1996);
- Both Sitting Duet (film, dir. Adam Roberts, 2003);
- Singing (film, dir. Adam Roberts, 2003).
- The Far End of the Garden. A profile of choreographer Jonathan Burrows (film, dir. Ross MacGibbon, A Beaulieu Films production for BBC Television and Arts Council Films, 1991)

== Awards and fellowships ==
- Frederick Ashton Choreographic Award, 1990;
- Digital Dance Award, 1992;
- Time Out Award, 1994;
- Prudential Award, 1995;
- Arts Council of England Fellowship 2000–02;
- Foundation for Contemporary Performance Arts, New York, for "ongoing contributions to contemporary dance", 2002;
- Nominated for South Bank Show award for Both Sitting Duet and Singing, 2003;
- New York Dance and Performance Bessie Awards, 2004.

== Articles and interviews ==
- Fifty contemporary choreographers: A Reference Guide, Martha Bremser and Deborah Jowitt, pp. 47–51.
- "Dialogue with Jonathan Burrows, Tim Etchells and Kate McIntosh, Siobhan Davies", Adrian Heathfield, at Siobhan Davies Dance Studios, March 2007
- "Speaking Dance: The Storm after the Calm", Daniela Perazzo pricks up her ears to Jonathan Burrows and Matteo Fargion, Dance Theatre Journal, 2007, Vol. 22, No. 2, pp. 9–11. Publisher: Laban Centre for Movement and Dance
- "Jonathan Burrows Group DVD", Perazzo, D, Dance Theatre Journal, 2006, Vol. 21, No. 3, pp. 45–46. Publisher: Laban Centre for Movement and Dance
- "The Sitting Duo Now Walks, or the Piece That Lies Quietly Underneath", Daniela Perazzo talks to Jonathan Burrows about his latest piece with Matteo Fargion, Dance Theatre Journal, 2005, Vol. 21, No. 2, pp. 2–7. Publisher: Laban Centre for Movement and Dance
- "Difference and Repetition in Both Sitting Duet", Briginshaw, V. A., Topoi, 2005, Vol. 24, No. 1, pp. 15–28. Publisher: Springer Science + Business Media
- "Two Men, Two Chairs, interview with Jonathan Burrows", Polzer, L., Dancing Times, 2004, Issue 1131, pp. 17–20. The Dancing Times Limited.
- "Both Talking: Interview with Jonathan Burrows and Matteo Fargion", Donald Hutera, Dance Umbrella News, October 2003
- "Playing the Game Harder, Jonathan Burrows in conversation", Dance Theatre Journal, 2002, Vol. 18, Part 4, pp. 25–29. Publisher: Laban Centre for Movement and Dance, ISSN 0264-9160
- "Jonathan Burrows: Exploring the Frontiers", Duerden, R., Dancing Times March 2001, pp. 551–557
- Dancemakers’ Portfolio: Conversations with Choreographers, eds. Jo Butterworth and Gill Clarke, Bretton Hall, 1998
- "Liberating the Imagination", Edith Boxberger, Ballet International, Winter 1996
- The Full Score: The Dance Issue, with Kevin Volans, Autumn/Winter 1996
- "Closing in on Ballet", Nadine Meisner, Dance Theatre Journal, 13(2), 1996
- "Jonathan Burrows Group", Sophie Constanti, Dance Times, July 1996
- "Jonathan Burrows’ New Work for Sylvie Guillem" (on Blue Yellow), Sophie Constanti, Dance Theatre Journal, Winter 1995/96
- "Burrows: Our Thoughts", Chris de Marigny, Dance Theatre Journal, 11(2), Spring/Summer 1994
- "Dream Ticket", Ann Nugent, Dance Now, Summer 1994
- "Leading Lights", Dance Now, Spring 1994
- "Jonathan Burrows: The Laughter of Recognition", Marilyn Hunt, Dance Magazine, Oct 1993
- "Three by Three", Carol Brown, Eleanor Brickhill, Ann Nugent, Dance Now, Spring 1993
- "Talking to an Enigma", Edward Thorpe, Dance and Dancers, June/July 1991
- "Dance Scene: The Jonathan Burrows Group", Dancing Times, June 1991
- "Young Classical Choreographers", Dance Study Supplement 4, Dancing Times, Jan 1990
- "Home Reviews: Victoria Marks, Jonathan Burrows, The Place", John Percival, Dance and Dancers, November/December 1988
- "Language is Key in Dancing", Interview with Jonathan Burrows, Susanne Lettner, The European, 29.12.2015
- "The POSTDANCE Dialogues: Jonathan Burrows and Andros Zins-Browne", Movement Research, 18 December 2015
