= Shelley Senter =

American dancer, dance teacher, and Alexander Technique practitioner

Shelley Senter is an American dancer, dance teacher, and Alexander Technique practitioner. Originally from Denver, Colorado, she moved to New York City to dance with the Trisha Brown Dance Company.

== Career ==
In addition to her time with the Trisha Brown Dance Company, Senter has worked with many choreographers on both sides of the Atlantic Ocean. In 2014, Senter was involved in Boris Charmatz's project, expo zéro, at the Kunstsaele in Berlin, Germany. Along with her Lower Left colleagues, Senter performed we do our part at the Broadway Performance Hall as part of the Seattle Festival of Dance Improvisation in 2013. In 2010 Senter performed grey matter at Danspace Project at St. Marks.

== Teaching ==
Senter is an internationally known teacher of dance, repetiteur of choreography by Trisha Brown and Yvonne Rainer, and of Alexander Technique. She has taught at festivals and studios such as Movement Research, Impulstanz in Vienna, and Tanzfabrik in Berlin.

As of December 2020, she is on faculty at Sarah Lawrence College.
