= Movement Research =

Non-profit arts organization in New York City

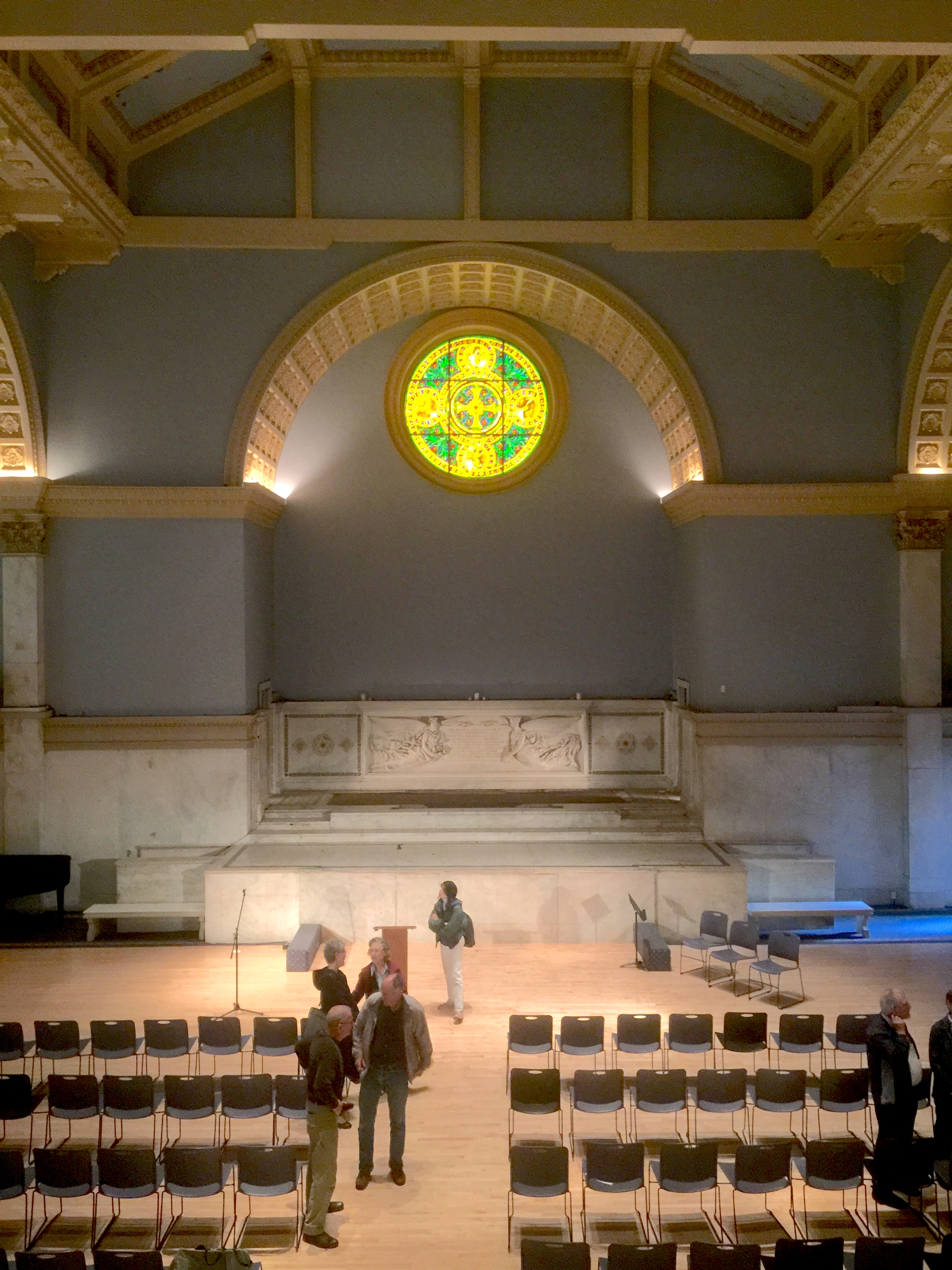
- Interior of the performance space at Judson Memorial Church.
- Founded: 1978
- Location: New York City
- Website: movementresearch.org

Movement Research is a non-profit organization based in New York City that offers dance classes, workshops, residencies, and performance opportunities for artists. It is dedicated to the implementation of free and low-cost programs geared towards experimentation. Founded in 1978 under the name “The School for Movement Research & Construction,” the organization began to host performances and workshops periodically in 1979 and was incorporated as a not-for profit organization in 1980. With over 11 interrelated core programs, Movement Research annually serves over 16,000 participants interactions, including artists, students, and audience members. The organization is currently operating three studios in the newly renovated 122 Community Center and holds space in other parts of the city as well.

== Initiatives ==
Among Movement Research's initiatives are a weekly dance practice at Judson Memorial Church, Open Performance, an open discussion moderated by a Movement Research Artist-in-Residence, Studies Project, a curated series of panels, and performances focused on a variety of issues, and the two-week Movement Research Festival that explores contemporary dance and the issues around it. They also host a series of low-cost classes led by dance artists; an artist in residence program known by the name AIR; and MRX, a traveling artist in residence program.

== History ==
In its founding in 1978, Movement Research, then called "The School for Movement Research and Construction," had an initial vision to create a centralized space where one could involve themselves in workshops that explore new movement techniques and body research. Movement Research's first benefit presentation was held in April of 1979 at 40 Irving Place, and featured dancers Trisha Brown, David Gordon, Valda Setterfield, and Douglas Dunn. In 1980, the organization was incorporated as a non-profit and adopted the name "Movement Research, Inc." which is still used today. Movement Research's first Board of Directors consisted only of artists, including Wendell Beavers, Beth Goren, Richard Kerry, Daniel Lepkoff, Terence O’Reilly, Mary Overlie, Christina Svane, and Board President Cynthia Hedstrom.

Between 1978 and 1982, Movement Research went from hosting 8 classes taught by 6 teachers to teaching 19 classes by 12 teachers. In 1982, Movement Research’s Studies Project begins to take shape, curating a space for community dialogues that focus on issues of aesthetics and philosophy at the intersection of dance and social politics. Participants included the likes of Mark Morris, Senta Driver, Molissa Fenley, Bill T. Jones, Steve Paxton, Spalding Gray, Eric Bogosian, Bill Irwin, David Gordon, Rachel Rosenthal, Blondell Cummings, Ethyl Eichelberger, David Cale, Pooh Kaye, Robert Whitman, Kei Takei, Joan Jonas, Dana Reitz, Kenneth King, Jim Self, Ishmael Houston-Jones, Remy Charlip, Meredith Monk and such moderators as Paul Langland, William Harris, Sally Banes, Simone Forti, Mary Overlie, and Stephanie Skura.

In the Spring of 1984, Movement Research moved into Ethnic Folk Arts Center at 179 Varick Street in exchange for managing the bookings of EFAC’s studio. The organization received free use of the office space and the studio for its own programming, making it MR's first permanent home. During this period the organization was also using other spaces across the city such as St. Mark's Church and The Triplex. That same year, a new program was introduced called The Presenting Series, which involved weekly performances of finished choreographies.

Under Administrative Director Richard Elovich, Movement Research sought to adjust its role in accordance to the political climate, which was deeply influenced by the ongoing AIDS crisis and its effect on the dance community. In 1989, the Artist-In-Residence program was launched, providing resources such as rehearsal space and performance opportunities to dancers and choreographers. The duo DANCENOISE (Lucy Sexton and Annie Iobst), Lauri Nagel, Lisa Nelson, and Susan Rethorst were the first Artists-in-Residence at Movement Research. One program designed in response to the AIDS epidemic was Move-to-Heal, initiated in 1991 by choreographer Jaime Ortega, which offered movement classes to those with AIDS and their support networks, held at the Judson Church.

That same year, Movement Research was evicted from their residency at Ethnic Folk Arts Center and replaced with a night club. In search of a new space, Elovich opened a conversation with the director of Judson Memorial Church, initiating one of their most well known and ongoing performance series titled Movement Research at the Judson Church which was intended to showcase works in progress, a series which still persists today.

After 40 years jumping from various temporary locations and many dance studios across lower Manhattan, Movement Research moved into its first permanent home at 122 Cultural Center at 150 First Avenue in 2019.

== Publications ==
Movement Research has two publications: Performance Journal, a printed piece that focuses on current issues in performance; and Critical Correspondence, a web-based publication that includes interviews, experimental and scholarly writing, podcasts and video projects. "Critical Correspondence" is currently edited by Amelia Bande and Tess Dworman.

The first issue of the Performance Journal was published in 1990. Editor Richard Elovich, the Executive Director, and Associate Editor Michael Sexton write,

"With this first issue of Movement Research, we open a new public space for the New York performance community: a textual space in which artists can develop a critical relationship to the work being produced around us…Recognizing a real lack of opportunity for choreographers, dancers, writers, musicians, and performers to engage in each others’ work analytically, we have created Movement Research as a slightly anarchic forum in which opposing ideas and aesthetics can be seriously developed and debated…In a time when the arts and artists are seriously under attack, a dialogue among artists develops both the rigorous introspection and the larger commitment of a community, creating a vision necessary for survival."
