= Nancy Smith =

Nancy Smith may refer to:

- Nancy Smith (politician) (born c. 1946), Ottawa city councillor
- Nancy Smith (designer) (1881–1962), British designer
- Nancy Maria Smith, see List of Joseph Smith's wives
- Nancy Stark Smith (1952–2020), American dancer
- Nancy Murdoch (born 1969), later Smith, Scottish curler

== See also ==
- Nancy Banks-Smith (born 1929), British television and radio critic
