= Earthdance Creative Living =

Earthdance Creative Living Project (commonly known as Earthdance) is a nonprofit, artist-run workshop, residency, and retreat center located in Plainfield, Massachusetts. Founded in 1986 by a group of dancers and artists, it is internationally recognized as a pioneering hub for movement arts, somatic practices, and creative collaboration. Earthdance is considered one of the oldest, if not the oldest, intentional community centered on the practice of contact improvisation and has played a significant role in the global development of this form.

== History ==
Earthdance was established in 1986 when a collective of dancers and artists from Boston purchased a 175-acre property in the foothills of the Berkshire Hills to create a rural home dedicated to artistic exploration and communal living.

The land encompasses the former Betts Manganese Mine, a historic mining operation that was active primarily from 1939 to 1942. Operated by metallurgist Anson Gardner Betts, the mine was part of the Hawley Mineral Belt and known for its deposits of manganese-bearing minerals including rhodonite (the official gemstone of Massachusetts), rhodochrosite, spessartine garnets, and tephroite.

Remnants of the mining era, including the mine pits and waste piles, remain on the Earthdance property. The organization maintains a connection to this geological heritage by permitting limited mineral collecting in designated areas by prior arrangement.

As of 2026, Earthdance operates with a small core staff and a rotating team of work-exchangers who participate in both administrative and operational aspects of the community.

== Impact ==
Earthdance has been widely recognized for its role in shaping contemporary movement practices and fostering alternative models of community and artistic engagement.

In a 2016 feature, Stance on Dance described Earthdance as “a different way of living and dancing,” emphasizing its unique integration of dance with communal life. The article highlighted the transformational experiences of participants and Earthdance’s ability to serve as both a retreat and an incubator for new artistic practices.

Contact Quarterly, a respected journal in the dance community, acknowledged Earthdance’s twenty-fifth anniversary with a discussion on preserving the ethos and essence of the place, and its significance in the evolution and dissemination of Contact Improvisation. A 1996 article in the Daily Hampshire Gazette documented the center’s resilience amid changing leadership and economic pressures, underscoring its importance to the cultural landscape of western Massachusetts.
