= DanceAbility International =

Dance company

DanceAbility International is a dance company that trains inclusive dance teachers worldwide, as well as offering Youth Outreach and education programs, and performances. DanceAbility promotes contemporary dance performance that mixes able and disabled dancers in the same performances. This dance genre is often called "inclusive dance", "MixedAbility" or "physically integrated dance".

According to the Mission Statement of DanceAbility International, "The work of DanceAbility International helps decrease prejudice and misconceptions about diversity in the field of dance, and by extension in society".

== Techniques ==
DanceAbility trains its dancers using improvisation techniques, mainly Contact Improvisation. This is "a forum in which able and disabled dancers learn to move together". Alessi has described Contact Improvisation as a technique that evolved

from an experiment to a method with a very specific approach for any combination of people [...] At first, I thought inclusion was the issue, but the real problem for people with most kinds of disabilities is not inclusion but isolation. So we teach that every person can make movement and any part of a person’s body can express emotion—this form of dance is a heightened ability to communicate. It’s about not labeling, about creating language.

Alessi has said that he was greatly influenced in his career by the experience of growing up with family members with disabilities: "I have three immediate relatives with disabilities—my mother was quadriplegic following a traffic accident when I was 7, my sister had polio, and my uncle had what I call 'unique mental capabilities'". Alessi was also influenced by the dance cultures of the various inner cities he was exposed to while moving often as a child.

== Programmes ==
Dancers who have worked with DanceAbility include Alito Alessi, Emery Blackwell, Karen Nelson, Scott Smith, and Charlene Curtis. Alessi launched DanceAbility with Karen Nelson in 1987, after reading an article about Contact Improvisation in Contact Quarterly dance and improvisation journal. DanceAbility began as a project of the Joint Forces Dance Company, giving a workshop on Contact Improvisation. DanceAbility became an international project beginning with workshops in Germany in 1991; teachers of inclusive and contemporary dance from several countries participated in DanceAbility gatherings annually during the early 1990s in Eugene, Oregon.

In the early years of DanceAbility, the majority of inclusive dance teachers were self-taught. DanceAbility offered teacher certification in 1997. Teacher training remains one of its core projects. Teacher training is now given in several countries, including:

- the United States (Eugene, Oregon)
- Buenos Aires, Argentina
- Milan, Italy
- Amsterdam, Netherlands
- Trier, Germany
- Vienna, Austria (at ImPulsTanz Festival)
- Helsinki, Finland

Following a major donation in 2007 from Marisa De Leon, founder of a school for children with disabilities in Montevideo, Uruguay, DanceAbility International has expanded into Latin America. Workshops have been held in Mexico City, Buenos Aires, Puerto Madryn, São Paulo, and Montevideo.

DanceAbility International has been the subject of three documentaries:

- Common Ground
- All Bodies Speak
- Joy Lab Research

Alessi's writing on the topic of Contact Improvisation has appeared in Contact Quarterly dance journal, and in Dance, Human Rights, and Social Justice—Dignity in Motion, edited by Naomi Jackson and Toni Shapiro-Phim.

== Youth Outreach ==
Alessi has performed with a partner in a wheelchair since 1995, exposing tens of thousands of children to physically integrated dance. Performances have been held in North, Central, and South America, Europe and Asia.

== See also ==
- Contemporary dance
- Contact Quarterly
- Disability in the arts
- Physically integrated dance
