= Nina Martin =

Nina Martin may refer to:

- Nina Martin (journalist)
- Nina Martin (dancer)
