= Contact dance =

Contact dance may refer to:

- Contact improvisation, a form of dance improvisation
- Lap dance, a type of sex work
