= Cari Ann Shim Sham =

Cari Ann Shim Sham is an American filmmaker, choreographer, media artist, and academic. She is a full arts professor at New York University’s Tisch School of the Arts. ' In 2017, She received the Best VR Film award at the NYC Indie Film Festival.

== Early life and education ==
Shim Sham studied at the University of California, Los Angeles (UCLA), earning a Bachelor of Arts in World Arts and Cultures (Dance) in 1997 and a Master of Fine Arts in Choreography in 2009. During her graduate studies, she met David Rousseve and joined his company Roussève/REALITY as a resident video artist and filmmaker.

== Career ==
She joined New York University’s Tisch School of the Arts as a faculty member in dance and new media, later becoming Associate Professor and then full Arts Professor. She served as director of the NYU Dance & Technology Program from 2017 to 2020.

Her artistic practice focuses on movement in relation to emerging technologies, including artificial intelligence, blockchain-based art, generative systems, interactive performance, and immersive media. She is the creator of body landscapes, a generative art and animated film project, and dance prompts, an open-source AI choreography system. She is also co-founder, with Joey Zaza, of the Museum of Wild and Newfangled Art (mowna).

As a filmmaker, she has directed experimental works combining choreography and cinematic techniques, including body landscapes, Parksville Murders (2017), and SAND (2010). Her work has been presented at United Nations General Assembly and Lincoln Center.

In addition to directing, she has worked as a cinematographer, editor, and producer on documentary and dance films, including Two Seconds After Laughter and One Day on Earth. She has also contributed video design to live performance, including the reconstruction of Robert Rauschenberg’s Shiner for Trisha Brown’s Set & Reset/Reset.

Her work has been exhibited and screened at The Wrong Biennial, the Texekspressionizm program at CAMUZ, and the Out-FRONT! Film Series in New York City.

Her generative work wobimo: a magical sigil generator for what is needed most was exhibited in Art on Tezos: Berlin. Other exhibitions include Techspressionism exhibitions in New York, the San Francisco Dance Film Festival, Sans Souci Festival, Jacob’s Pillow, and the Museum of Boulder.

== Scholarly and artistic work ==
Shim Sham’s research focuses on choreography, media theory, and emerging technologies, particularly artificial intelligence and generative systems. Her works include Dance as Generative Art (2022), body landscapes (2023), and wobimo (2025).

She has contributed writing to publications including Dance Chronicle and developed educational materials for One Day on Earth.

== Selected filmography ==
- body landscapes (2024) – Director
- pandemic statements (2022) – Director
- Parksville Murders (2017) – Director
- Last Leaf (2018) – Director
- chicken boy (2012) – Director
- SAND (2010) – Director
