= Grand Union (dance group) =

American dance troupe (active 1970–1976)

The Grand Union was an improvisational dance group based in New York City from 1970 to 1976. It grew out of Yvonne Rainer dance company, and her piece Continuous Project - Altered Daily. Rainer's sole authority as choreographer began to slip in early 1970 when the dancers, at her invitation, began to bring in their own materials for the piece. By late 1970, new members had joined the group and the materials were improvised to a much greater extent. The company, which was still often billed as "Yvonne Rainer and Dancers" in the beginning, chose "The Grand Union" as a name to avoid any obvious associations with dance to inoculate themselves against charges that what they were doing was not properly dance. To avoid problems with the supermarket chain of the same name, the group used the legal name "Rio Grand Union".

Dance artists involved with Grand Union included

- Trisha Brown
- Barbara Dilley
- Douglas Dunn
- David Gordon
- Nancy Lewis
- Steve Paxton
- Yvonne Rainer

Others who performed as guests or rehearsed with the group include:

- Becky Arnold
- Vicky Ruane
- Valda Setterfield
- Lincoln Scott

About 6 to 9 dancers would appear for each performance, which generally lasted about 2 hours. In 1982, David Gordon, one of the regular performers, described one concert in Ohio:

[A]n audience of 200 showed up ... [A]fter the first half-hour, there were approximately 150 people left, and after the second half-hour there were 100 people and by the time performance ended there were somewhere between 12 and 20 people left, And those few people who stayed around at the end, asked us where we were going next. "You don't know what this means to us out here," they said. "You don't know what you've done, how you've changed our lives." ... It took me awhile to understand that if 180 people walk out, it isn't the end of the world – if the 20 people left have the best time they've ever had.

== See also ==
- contact improvisation
- dance improvisation
- Judson Dance Theater
- postmodern dance
