= Audrée Estey =

Canadian-born American dancer (1910–2002)

Audrée Phipps Estey
- Born: Audrée Phipps; January 7, 1910; Winnipeg, Manitoba, Canada
- Died: June 6, 2002 (aged 92); Deer Isle, Maine, U.S.
- Known for: American Repertory Ballet

Audrée Phipps Estey (January 7, 1910 – June 6, 2002), known as "New Jersey's First Lady of Dance", was an American dancer who founded the Princeton Ballet Society and the American Repertory Ballet.

== Biography ==
Estey was born in Winnipeg, Manitoba, on January 7, 1910, as Audrée Phipps. She married and had a son, Lawrence M. Estey and a daughter, Carol Estey. In 1954 she founded the Princeton Ballet Society. In 1963 she founded the American Repertory Ballet. She died on June 6, 2002, in Deer Isle, Maine.
