= Larry Fagin =

American writer (1937–2017)

Larry Fagin (July 21, 1937 – May 27, 2017) was an American poet, editor, publisher, and teacher, and a member of the New York School.

== Biography ==
Born in Far Rockaway, New York City, Larry Fagin grew up in New York, Hollywood, and Europe. He began associating with poets and writers in 1957, meeting David Meltzer in Los Angeles, and Allen Ginsberg, William S. Burroughs, and Gregory Corso two years later in Paris. In 1962 he became part of the circle of poets around Jack Spicer in San Francisco, and befriended Michael McClure, Philip Whalen, and Robert Duncan. At the end of 1965 he traveled to London where he lived for two years and met his first wife, Joan Inglis. They returned to New York, and settled in San Francisco for most of 1968. Clark Coolidge became a close friend. Returning to New York within the year, he began editing Adventures in Poetry magazine and books, which featured most of the poets of the New York School. In the late 1960s Fagin's work was published in 0 to 9 magazine, an avant-garde journal which experimented with language and meaning-making.

In 1975, with the dancer Barbara Dilley, Fagin cofounded Danspace Project at St. Mark's Church in-the-Bowery; he was its artistic director for five years. Simultaneously, he taught writing at the Poetry Project at St. Mark's and in 1976 joined the faculty of the Summer Writing Program at the Naropa Institute in Boulder, Colorado. At Naropa, he met and married the writer Susan Noel. In 2000, with Cris Mattison, he revived the Adventures in Poetry imprint, and began editing and publishing Sal Mimeo magazine. Fagin’s recent books are Dig & Delve (Granary Books, 1999), Complete Fragments (Cuneiform Press, 2012), and Eleven Poems for Philip Guston (Granary Books, 2016). He continued to edit and teach privately in Manhattan until his death.

== Selected bibliography ==
- Parade of the Caterpillars (Angel Hair, 1968)
- Twelve Poems (Angel Hair, 1972); Landscape, with George Schneeman (Angel Hair, 1972)
- Rhymes of a Jerk (Kulchur Foundation, 1974)
- Seven Poems (Big Sky, 1976)
- Poems Larry Fagin Drawings Richard Tuttle (Topia Press, 1977)
- I'll Be Seeing You: Selected Poems (Full Court Press, 1978)
- Stabs (Poltroon, 1979)
- The List Poem (Teachers & Writers Collaborative, 1991)
- On the Pumice of Morons, with Clark Coolidge (The Figures, 1993)
- Dig & Delve, with Trevor Winkfield (Granary Books, 1999)
- Complete Fragments (Cuneiform Press, 2012)
- Eleven Poems for Philip Guston, with drawings by Philip Guston (Granary Books, 2016)

== Sources ==
- A Secret Location on the Lower East Side, Adventures in Writing, 1960-1980, ed. Steven Clay and Rodney Phillips, (The New York Public Library/Granary Books, 1998)
- The Angel Hair Anthology, ed Anne Waldman and Lewish Warsh, (Granary Books, 2001)
- Larry Fagin Papers, Archives & Special Collections at the Thomas J. Dodd Research Center, University of Connecticut
- New York Times "City Room" profile
- The New Yorker "None of Us Will Ever Be Famous"
- Poets & Writers profile: The Glass Filter
