= Nancy Stark Smith =

American dancer (1952–2020)

Nancy Stark Smith (February 11, 1952 – May 1, 2020) was an American dancer and founding participant in contact improvisation.

== Early life and education ==
Born in Brooklyn, New York, on February 11, 1952, Stark Smith was the child of Dr. Joseph J. Smith, a professor of gynecology and obstetrics at Albert Einstein College of Medicine, and his wife Lucille (Stark) Smith. In 1954, her family moved to Great Neck, New York, and her mother died when she was five.

Initially she trained as an athlete and gymnast and had little interest in dance, “I’d see the dancers standing in front of a wall of mirrors looking at themselves and making little movements. I didn’t understand what was exciting about that.” Stark Smith’s interest in dance was sparked in her first year at Oberlin College, where she participated in a residence with the Twyla Tharp company. She was intrigued by Tharp’s movement practices and inspired to continue studying modern and post-modern dance. While in college she took a class with Steve Paxton, an American dancer and creator of contact improvisation (which was then a nascent dance form). Stark Smith was moved by this technique and expressed her desire to continue working with Paxton. However, at that time, Paxton only worked with male dancers.

She attended Oberlin College. It was at Oberlin in 1971 that she was discovered by the internationally famous dance choreographer, Twyla Tharp.

In 1972, she participated in a performance project led by Paxton in which they practiced various improvisation techniques, including rolling and falling, throwing and catching one another, identifying flows of energy in the body, and generally exploring contact in duets. The performances they showed at the John Weber Gallery in New York City were the first performances of contact improvisation. Paxton later praised Stark Smith's dance abilities: “She was athletic, she was responsive, she would take initiative… she was very daring.”

After graduating from Oberlin College with a degree in dance and writing, Stark Smith participated in a Reunion Tour with Paxton and other dancers, and showed work at a venue known as the “Kitchen” in downtown Manhattan, which helped to grow the popularity of contact improvisation.

== Contact improvisation ==
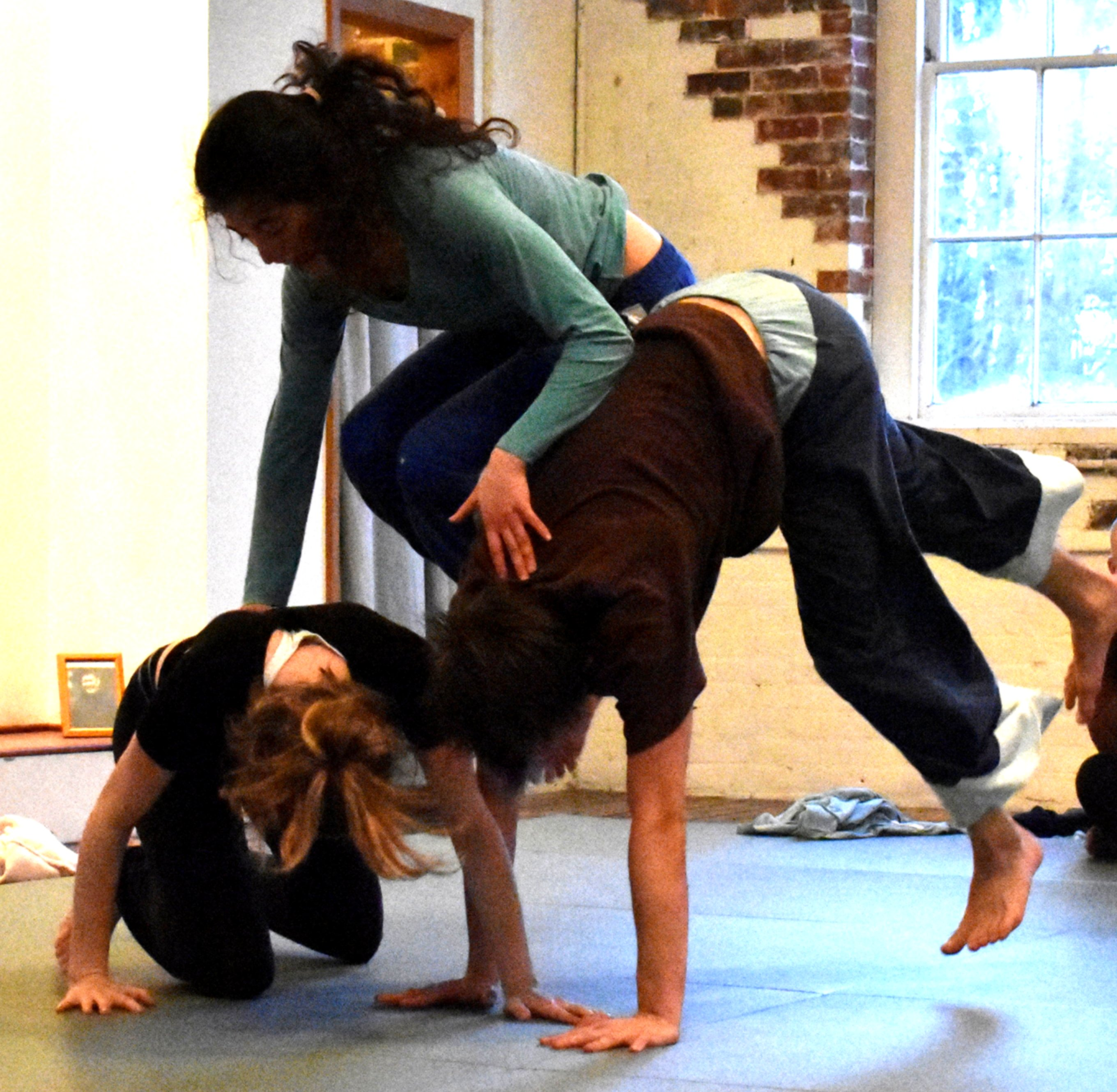
A contact improvisation trio photographed during a workshop led by Nancy Stark Smith (in Florence, Massachusetts, 2017).

According to the International Encyclopedia of Dance, contact improvisation is “primarily a duet form (the most basic unit of social interaction) that emphasizes the qualities of mutual trust and interdependence by requiring ongoing contact between the two participants.” Stark Smith herself stated that having a partner is the key to contact improv, both to the form itself and to its growth through sharing the technique with others: we “create partners so we could continue to dance.” The form was largely popularized by Paxton, Stark Smith, and other early innovators, who disseminated it through teaching across the country. In reflecting on early performances of contact improvisation, Stark Smith recalled people were excited and surprised by its disregard for traditional gender roles employed in dance: women lifting men was radical in the early 1970s.

As contact improvisation gained a following, Paxton and others expressed concern for the safety of dancers learning the form without proper training. In 1975, Stark Smith founded Contact Newsletter (later Contact Quarterly), an international journal of dance and improvisation, which she continued to co-edit and produce with Lisa Nelson until her death. In the early years of contact improvisation, Contact Quarterly expressed Steve Paxton, Stark Smith's, and other core members choice to make informal leadership and community groups the culture of contact improvisation. Eschewing a trademark and policing of teachers, they used Contact Quarterly to influence and create open communication among leaders, teachers, and contact dancers. Stark Smith maintained that there was no precise pedagogy for teaching the form, and this gave dancers the freedom to innovate. About learning improvisation, she stated, “Once you get a clear feel for the basic premise, develop a few safety skills, and get your reflexes primed and ready, then you're off. You learn by doing.”

Throughout her life Stark Smith worked as a dancer, performer, instructor, author, and organizer. She travelled the world to teach and present performances of contact and improvised dance. She collaborated with numerous partners including Steve Paxton, Julyen Hamilton, Karen Nelson (dancer), and the musician and composer Mike Vargas, who later became her partner.

Beginning in 1990, Stark Smith inspired by her students realized that any jam follows the same underlying sequence of patterns. This underlying score was later labelled as the Underscore, dozens of phases were identified.. The conscious knowledge of these sequences and phases can help to initiate long-form contact improvisation jams, while providing guidance in the development of the dancing. The actual practice is preceded by a verbal talk-through one night before, in which the key phases are outlined. The Underscore is envisaged as an arc that enables dancers to establish the mind–body connections that most support improvisation and to explore various forms of connection, before concluding with reflection ("harvesting"). When introducing the Underscore, facilitators use Stark Smith's 'hieroglyph' movement drawings. Originally created by Stark Smith as spontaneous drawings, the shapes and lines of such 'hieroglyphs' are intended to communicate the internal sensations of a moving body and elicit free interpretation by dancers. Dancers are encouraged to create their own 'hieroglyph' drawings. The process of translating the experience of dance into the illustration reflects her aim to communicate the subjectivities and fluidity in dance as a stimulus for creative practice. The illustrations are intended to trigger an esthetic response in others, and participants are invited to embody them.

== Death ==
She died from ovarian cancer in Florence, Massachusetts at the age of 68, on May 1, 2020.

== See also ==
- Steve Paxton
- Contact improvisation
- Dance improvisation
- Judson Dance Theater
- Postmodern dance
- Dance notation
