= American Repertory Ballet =

Non-profit organization in the USA

Coordinates: 40.31202°N 74.51616°W

The American Repertory Ballet (ARB) is an American ballet company based in New Jersey.

The company was founded by Audrée Estey in 1963, as the Princeton Regional Ballet Company. In 1978, it became a professional company and was renamed Princeton Ballet Company. It was named American Repertory Ballet in 1990. The former Garden State Ballet merged with ARB during the 1995–1996 season.

ARB is a founding resident company of the New Brunswick Performing Arts Center.

== Artistic directors ==
The company's former directors are:

- Douglas Martin (2010–2019)
- Graham Lustig (1999–2010)
- Septime Webre (1993–1999)
- Marjorie Mussman (1992–1993)
- Dermot Burke (1986–1992)
- Judith Leviton (1982–1986)
- Audrée Estey (1963–1982)

== Dancers ==
The dancers for the American Repertory Ballet's 2019–2020 season are:

- Shaye Firer (2011–)
- Nanako Yamamoto (2013–)
- Aldeir Monteiro (2016–)
- Erikka Reenstierna-Cates (2016–)
- Emily Parker (2016–)
- Journy Wilkes-Davis (2017–)
- Ruben Rascon (2018–)
- Daniel Cooke (2018–)
- Tanner Bleck (2018–)
- Ryoko Tanaka (2018–)
- Annie Johnson (2018–)
- Marie Tender (2018–)
- Matanya Solomon (2019–)

== Production Department ==
- N. James Whitehill III, Production Consultant (2022-2025)

== Summer Intensive ==
The Princeton Ballet School's summer intensive, established in 1981, run by Princeton Ballet School director Aydmara Cabrera is an internationally renowned five-week program for young dancers from age 12 through 23 years old.
