= Danspace Project =

Dance performance venue

Danspace Project is an organization that presents and commissions contemporary dance. Its performances are held in St. Mark's Church in the East Village area of the Manhattan borough of New York City.

== History ==
While working for the Poetry Project (also housed in St. Mark's), Larry Fagin was asked by the group The Natural History of the American Dancer to perform in the church's sanctuary. This performance in December 1974 with Carmen Beauchat, Suzzane Harris, Cynthia Hedstrom, Rachel Lew, Barbara Dilley, and Judy Padow was the first Danspace production. Barbara Dilley and Mary Overlie then helped in organizing the beginnings of Danspace. Fagin was the organization's Program Director until 1980 when Cynthia Hedstrom became the organization's director.

A fire damaged the church in 1978 and performances were temporarily held at the Third Street Music School.

From 1984 to 1989 Terry Fox led the organization. Amy Lamphere, was director from 1989 to 1992, when Laurie Uprichard became the Executive Director.

Judy Hussie-Taylor became the Executive Director in 2008. In 2010, she launched the Platform series, which invites an artist to curate performances and events around a certain theme.

Danspace has shaped contemporary New York dance history presenting artists such as Ishmael Houston-Jones, Bill T. Jones, Trajal Harrell, Okwui Okpokwasili, and many others.

== See also ==
- Dance in the United States
- List of theaters for dance
