= Nancy Smith (designer) =

British designer

Nancy Smith (1881-1962) was a British designer. She began her career as a book illustrator but became one of the first professional female poster designers in Britain.

In 1916, Smith became a founder member of the Decorative Art Group, founded by Henry Nevinson. She created numerous posters for London Transport, including one showing Epping Forest in 1922, which had become accessible by the Central Line.
