= Contact improvisation =

Form of improvised dancing

Contact Improvisation
- Also known as: CI, Contact, Contact Improv
- Country of origin: United States
- Creator: Steve Paxton
- Famous practitioners: Steve Paxton, Nancy Stark Smith, Lisa Nelson
- Parenthood: modern dance, postmodern dance, martial arts (Aikido), somatic practices (Release Technique)
- Descendant arts: Underscore (Nancy Stark Smith), Material for the Spine (Steve Paxton)

Contact improvisation (CI) is a postmodern dance practice that explores movement through shared weight, touch, and physical awareness. Originating in the United States in 1972, contact improvisation was developed by dancer and choreographer Steve Paxton, drawing on influences from modern dance, aikido, and somatic practices. Contact Improvisation emphasizes the interplay of gravity, momentum, and improvisation, fostering an experimental approach to movement that invites both professional dancers and newcomers into its global community.

The practice involves continuous physical touch between dancers, where gravity, momentum, inertia, and friction shape their interactions.

The dance is further described by Paxton:

"The exigencies of the form dictate a mode of movement which is relaxed, constantly aware and prepared, and onflowing".

Known for its open "jams," contact improvisation is both a social dance and a tool for movement research, offering a unique blend of physicality and mindfulness. Formally, contact improvisation is a movement improvisation that is explored with another being. According to one of its first practitioners, Nancy Stark Smith, it "resembles other familiar duet forms, such as the embrace, wrestling, surfing, martial arts, and the Jitterbug, encompassing a wide range of movement from stillness to highly athletic."

Contact improvisation has evolved into various formats, including performance art, experimental dance, and education. Figures like Nancy Stark Smith, Lisa Nelson, and Nita Little played significant roles in broadening its influence, integrating the practice into postmodern dance traditions and contemporary performance studies.

== History ==
=== From Magnesium to Contact Improvisations ===
Contact improvisation was developed in the United States in the 1970s by a group of dancers and athletes gathered under the guidance of choreographer and dancer Steve Paxton.

In January 1972, Steve Paxton was in residence at Oberlin College during a tour with Grand Union, a collective where he collaborated with other prominent figures in postmodern dance, including Yvonne Rainer and Trisha Brown. For several weeks, he offered Oberlin students two sets of practices:

1. every morning at dawn, a "soft class" involving an exploration that he soon called the "small dance," a form of meditation that is practiced standing, where attention is paid to postural adjustments and micro-weight transfers;
2. and later in the day, rehearsals for a performance that he transmitted to a group of young men and whose score is to explore the extremes of movement and disorientation, from standing still to falling, rolling, colliding, and jumping in the air. For these rehearsals, Steve Paxton relied on his training in modern dance (he had danced in the companies of José Limón and Merce Cunningham), in aikido and in gymnastics.

The combination of these practices culminated in Magnesium, a twenty-minute performance in which dancers performed on gym mats. The piece involved jumping, bumping into each other, manipulating, and clinging to one another. Paxton described the movements as using "the body as a whole, where all parts are simultaneously unbalanced or thrown against another body or into the air". After about fifteen minutes, the dancers stop and start a "Small Dance" that concludes the performance.

In the Spring of 1972, Steve Paxton received a grant from Change, Inc which allowed him to invite dancers to work on the form he was evolving. He invited some colleagues from the Judson Dance Theater years like Barbara Dilley and Nancy Topf, release technique pioneer Mary Fulkerson, as well as students met during his teaching tours, including Nancy Stark Smith and Curt Siddall (from Oberlin College), Danny Lepkoff and David Woodberry (from the University of Rochester, where Mary Fulkerson was a teacher) and Nita Little (from Bennington College).

At the end of this residency, the group presented a performance that Paxton named Contact Improvisations. The performance took the form of a continuous afternoon practice over five days at the John Weber Gallery in Manhattan. Spectators were free to come and go as the dancers practiced, alongside a concurrent film screening of George Manupelli's Dr. Chicago.

=== Expansion across regions ===
==== In North America ====
===== Styles =====
Following the first performance of Contact Improvisations in New York in 1972, the participants scattered to different parts of the United States but soon began to teach the practice. The syncopated, risky, raw and awkward style of the first performances gave place rather quickly to a variety of aesthetics within the form.

One of those aesthetics was the development of smooth, continuous, controlled flow of quality in the late 1970s and early 1980s, running parallel with the opposite trend of interest in conflict and unexpected responses, including previously avoided eye contact and direct hand contact. Says Nancy Stark Smith,

Within the study of Contact Improvisation, the experience of flow was soon recognized and highlighted in our dancing. It became one of my favorite practices and I proceeded to "do flow" for many years-challenging it, testing it: could we flow through this pass? Could we squeak through that one, and keep going?

Regardless of those aesthetic choices, the central characteristic of contact improvisation remains a focus on bodily awareness and physical reflexes rather than consciously controlled movements. One of the founders of the form, Daniel Lepkoff, comments that the “precedence of body experience first, and mindful cognition second, is an essential distinction between Contact Improvisation and other approaches to dance.” Another source affirms that the practice of contact improvisation involves “mindfulness, sensing and collecting information” as its core.

===== Languaging and observing =====
In 1975, the dancers working with Steve Paxton considered trademarking the term contact improvisation in order to control the teaching and practice of the dance form, consequently for reasons of safety. This idea was rejected in favor of establishing a forum for communication: this became the Contact Newsletter founded by Nancy Stark Smith, which evolved into the bi-annual journal Contact Quarterly which continues to be published online by the non-profit Contact Collaborations (incorporated in 1978) after a final print edition came out in January 2020. The journal, now co-edited by Nancy Stark Smith and Lisa Nelson, brings together different reflections of contact improvisation teachers and practitioners and cements an international community by equipping it with a communication organ, as well as hosting several other orders of reflections, including writings by contemporary dancers and somatic practitioners. According to the magazine's statement,

Contact Quarterly is the longest living, independent, artist-made, not-for-profit, reader-supported magazine devoted to the dancer's voice. Founded in 1975, Contact Quarterly (CQ) began as a forum for discussion of the emerging dance form Contact Improvisation. Serving as a meeting ground for a worldwide network of contact improvisers, CQquickly grew to include writings and interviews on postmodern and contemporary experimental dance, somatic movement practices, improvisational dance, mixed-abilities dance, teaching methods, creative process, and performance.

While the development of contact improvisation has benefited greatly from Nancy Stark Smith and Lisa Nelson's editorial work to support the writings of dancers in their exploration of the form, it also owes much to the cameras of Steve Christiansen and then Lisa Nelson, who documented many moments of the work (especially in performance) and allow the contactors to observe themselves with meticulousness.

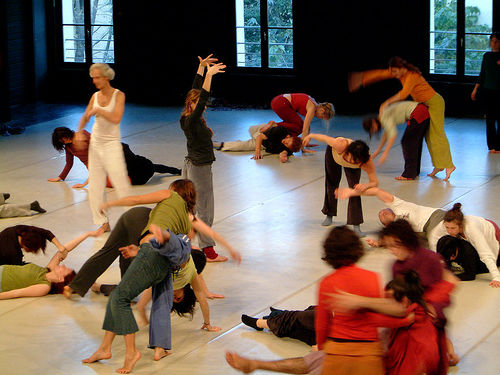
Contact Improvisation jam in Montpellier, France (2004

===== Development of art-sport =====
Since the mid-1970s, regular jams are present in most major cities in North America (New York City, Boston, San Francisco, and Montreal). Other multi-day residential spaces (such as the Breitenbush Jam, which has existed since 1981) have been in existence since the late 1970s. Remembers dancer Mark Pritchard,

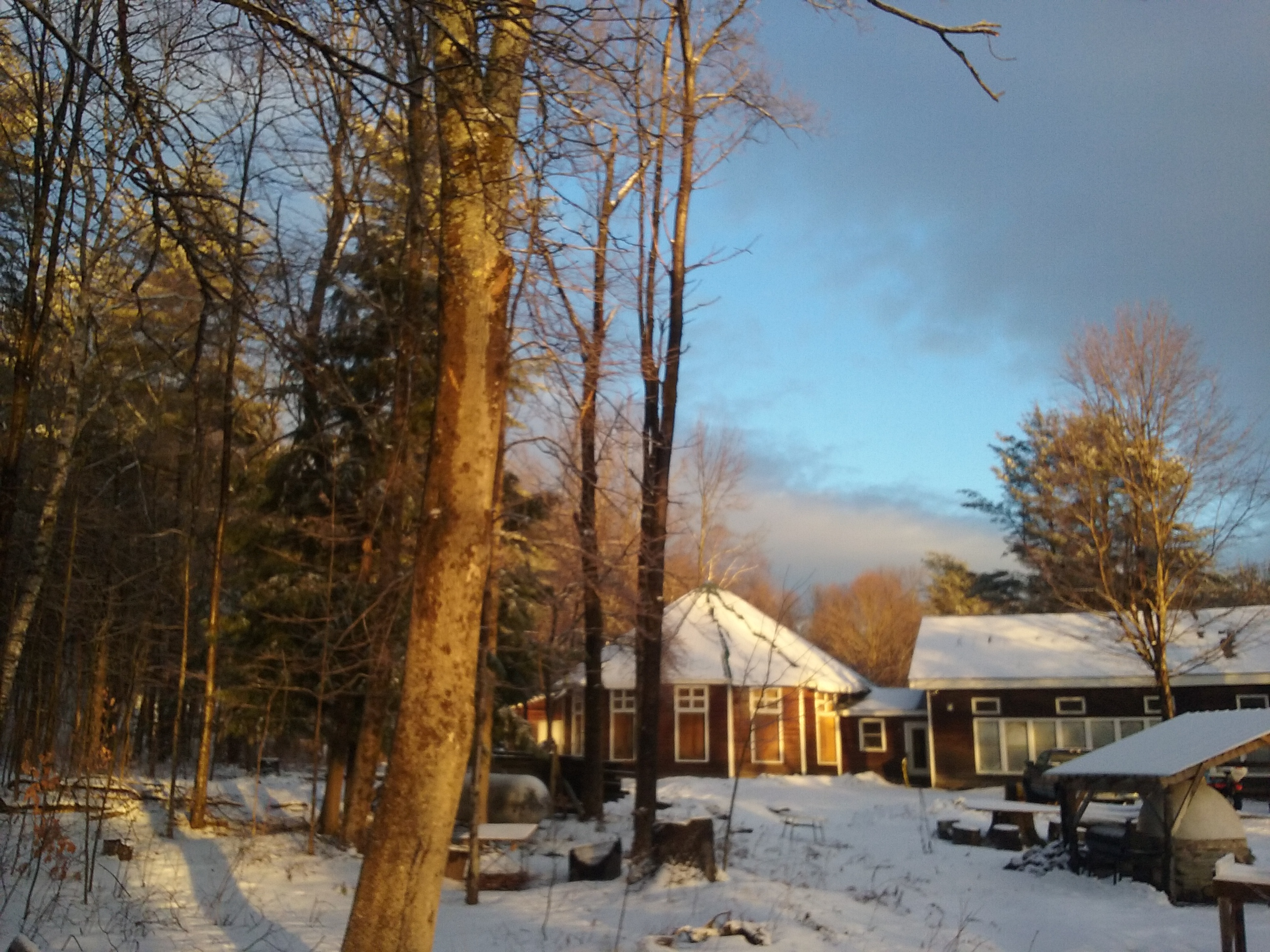
Earthdance artist-run residency center in western Massachusetts

The 1979 Country Jam was a first of its kind in the Contact world: over fifty people from the western United States and Canada came together for twelve days of non-structured existence, life and dance: neither a workshop, a conference or a seminar, but an improvisational gathering, with the sole aim of creating a space for dancing and living in flux... Our days were without structure, except for meals: at the beginning, we planned to keep 90-minute slots for the courses, but the idea was quickly abandoned thanks to a system based on Supply and demand, in which each could suggest a topic to be dealt with and offer to lead a class. These residential events (workshops, festivals, long jams) represent a parallel economy that invited the creation of dedicated spaces of practice, the model of which was provided very early by Earthdance, a residential center built in 1986 by a Boston community of dancers.

==== In Europe ====
In Europe, contact improvisation was presented for the first time in 1973 (from June 25 to 28th) in an art gallery in Rome, L'Attico run by Fabio Sargentini. In the 1970s and 1980s, Steve Paxton and Lisa Nelson were regularly invited to the Dartington College of Arts in Great Britain (where early contacter Mary Fulkerson was part of the dance faculty) and the School for New Dance Development in Amsterdam, which served as transmission belts for contact improvisation in Europe.

Nancy Stark Smith was key to the organization of the first European Contact Improvisation Teachers Exchange. Subsequent exchanges have been organized since 1985 and hosted each year by a different European country.

Belgian dancer and choreographer Patricia Kuypers noted in 1999 that, depending on the country and the individual, it has spread more or less rapidly in the world of dance or amateurs. In Belgium, where Steve Paxton had come since the 1980s, invited by the Klapstuk and the Kaaitheater, few professional dancers regularly practiced it, and apart from certain outbreaks of fever in successful jams, it can not be said that contact improvisation left any lasting trace among professional dancers, except in a choreographed form.

===== In France =====
In France, contact improvisation (sometimes called "danse-contact", as in French-speaking Canada) was introduced for the first time in 1978, where a contact improvisation course was given by Steve Paxton and Lisa Nelson during the musical festivities of Sainte Beaume:

Didier Silhol, Mark Tompkins, Suzanne Cotto, Edith Veyron and Martine Muffat-Joly attended. Their enthusiasm brought them together, to explore together this new form of dance, to organize new courses by bringing back Steve Paxton, Lisa Nelson and by inviting other teachers such as Nancy Stark Smith. In 1980, they created the association Danse Contact Improvisation and began to teach themselves, mostly in pairs.

Contact improvisation is now practiced in most major cities of the French metropolis - Paris, Grenoble, Lyon, Marseille, Montpellier, Lille, Rennes all have at least one weekly jam - and is taught in many conservatories, including the National Conservatory of Music and Dance of Paris.

==== In the world ====
The network of social practices or amateurs of contact improvisation has spread to all the continents except Antarctica, with a particularly intense presence in the Americas, Western and Eastern Europe, Finland, Russia, Israel, Japan, Taïwan, Australia, India, China and Malaysia, as evidenced by the regularity of the jams, festivals and weekly courses taught in these countries.

== Principles and techniques ==
=== Interior techniques ===
Contact Improvisation involves technical aspects or "moves" that support the duets and create a recognizable style of movements: shoulder and hip lifts, head-to-head improvisation, table-top position (being on all fours, supporting the weight of the partner on the back), surfing (rolling on the floor, being "surfed by" the partner), and aikido rolls.

But these are conceived of as the means to an end, which can be described as the dialogue of sensations of weight and touch between partners:

The body in [contact improvisation] is accordingly not merely a physical body whose weight and momentum are subject to natural laws of gravity and motion, but a responsive, experiencing body. Here it must be emphasized that despite the use of the term “inward focus” in Novack’s account, the cultivation of kinaesthetic awareness cannot be equated with an “introspective” preoccupation with private sensations; rather, the accent lies on sensing-through the responsive body, combining both “internal awareness” and “responsiveness to another”.

Steve Paxton insisted on this aspect with the concept of "interior techniques" involving in the dance practice a training of perception, resting on investigations based on the sciences of the senses (physiology, experimental and ecological psychology, anatomy, and behaviour sciences).

Lisa Nelson, in that regard, occupied a special place in the effervescence of the development of contact improvisation. Taking distance from the dance, she watched a lot through the eye of the camera and pursued personal research on the collaboration between the senses, in particular on the organization of kinaesthesia in relation to the way in which vision works (a practice later known as the "Tuning Scores"). As Patricia Kuypers remarked, "her staggered gaze nourished the maturation of the [contact improvisation], developing analysis of the perceptual system and revealing specific questions about how improvisation works."

=== Round robin ===
The "round robin" is the most frequent structure of performances, this happens where small groups of dancers arrive in the center of a supporting circle of other dancers, who can at any time integrate the couples and replace one of the two dancers. Dancers are dressed casually (sweat pants, T-shirts) and performances can happen in many venues, including theaters, bookstores, galleries. The duration of the concerts can go from 20 minutes to 6 hours.

Central to the poetics of the form is a desire to create a non-hierarchical way of developing the movement, based on the simple exchange of weight and touch between partners improvising together. This stance has been argued to reflect the counter-cultural context in which contact improvisation was developed (aftermath of the 1960s Vietnam War and Hippie movement).

=== Underscore ===
In the 1990s, Nancy Stark Smith, one of the most active propagators of contact improvisation and editor of Contact Quarterly, developed a practice out of her teachings called "the underscore." It consisted of a score serving as a descriptive and prescriptive base for the practice of group improvisations. In this practice, vocabulary is tailored to fit the specific experiences of dancers and benefits from Nancy Stark Smith enmeshment with contact improvisation.

As a teacher of contact improvisation, she had observed that particular warm-up exercises and movement activities were helpful in bringing dancers to a state of body-mind preparedness for engaging in a Contact duet. The Underscore is a scored collection of those exercises and activities, complete with pictographs called `glyhps' that represent each phase and subphase of its progression.

Some moments of the practice clearly refer to activities explored in the practice of contact improvisation:

- "Bonding with the earth" thus refers (in part) to the experience of the "Small Dance"
- "Engagement" to the commitment that can be involved in a contact improvisation duet
- "Skinesphere", the space beneath the skin (as opposed to the kinesphere, which is the space surrounding the body), refers to the inward focus involved in some somatic preparations for the practice of contact improvisation.

== Spaces of practice ==
=== Universities ===
In June 1980, Elizabeth Zimmer, organizer and director of the American Dance Guild, put together the conference Improvisation: Dance Considered as Art-Sport. The conference was mainly dedicated to contact improvisation, which had been referred to as an "art-sport" a few years earlier by Simone Forti, and introduced contact improvisation in the American academic world. Contact improvisation is now taught in a majority of American universities offering a choreographic curriculum (New York University, Oberlin College, Bennington College, Smith College, Ohio State University) as well as in many contemporary dance festivals (Jacob's Pillow, Bates Dance Festival).

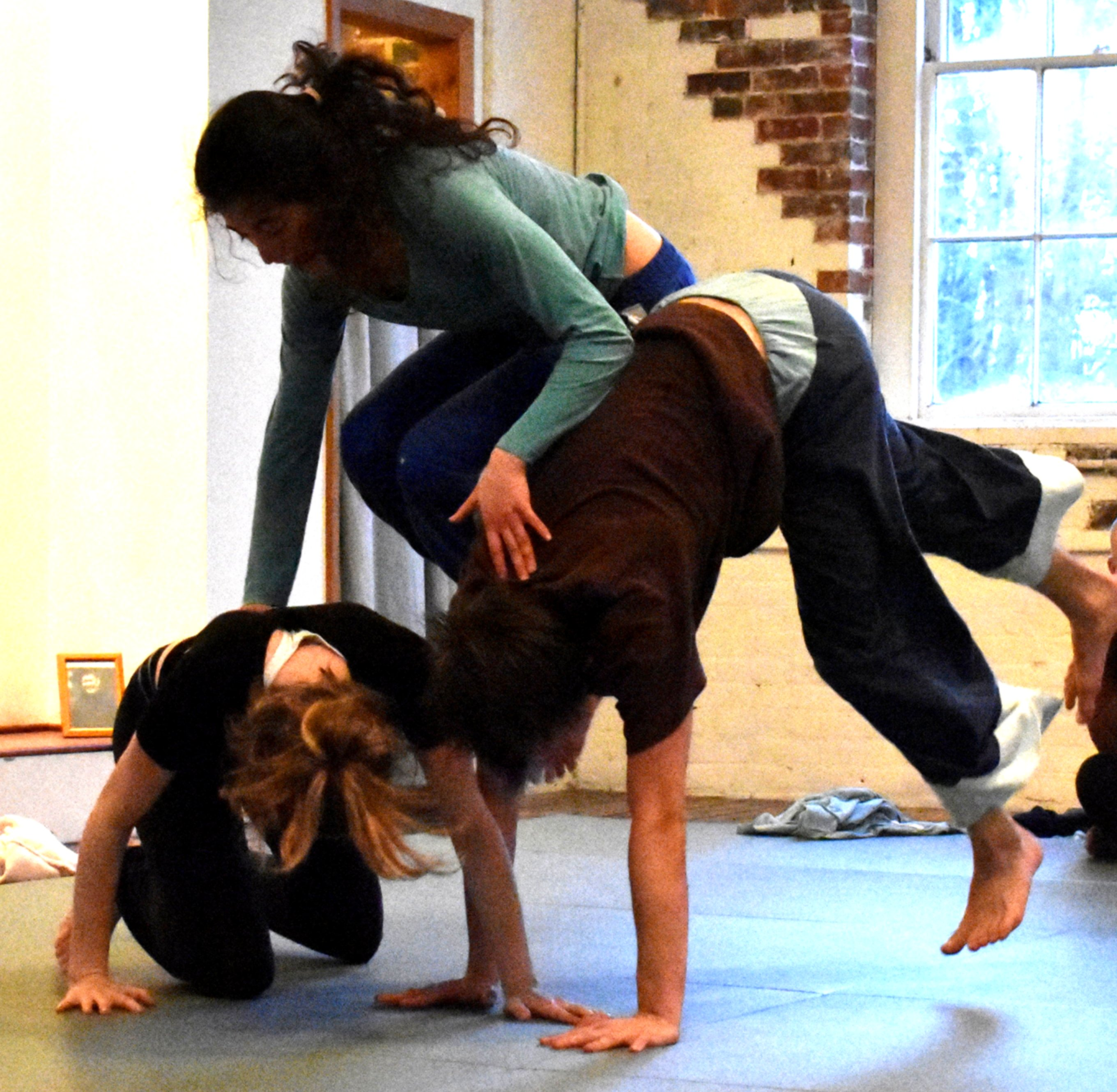
A contact improvisation trio (2017)

=== Jams ===
In the mid-1970s, the term "jam" appeared to describe, like jazz jam sessions and milongas in tango, an opportunity for free practice where dancers who do not know each other can meet and negotiate together their dance or observe the practice of their partners.

Every week in dozens of cities that make up an international network, members of this Contact Improvisation "community of experience" meet for a few hours in a dance studio for a jam. This hybrid practice seems to me to work halfway between a bodily meditation, a psycho-kinesthetic therapy, a sports training, and a dance improvised session.

Jams also occur at multi-day residential courses led by a dancer or a group of dancers at conferences or festivals, where the days can alternate between free practices, courses by guest artists, and debates regularly bring practitioners together.

==== Inclusion ====
Some have argued that this relaxed space of practice favoured contact improvisation's inclusivity towards disabled movers:

Unlike a structured workshop or a performance, the Contact jam setting allows for open-ended dancing, a mode particularly conducive to dancers with different abilities. For one thing, it is a lot easier to rest or stop and talk with your partner... More than any other genre of dance, Contact Improvisation has nurtured and embraced dancing that can integrate multiple abilities and limitations. In fact, many of the most renowned nondisabled Contact practitioners (including Steve Paxton), spend a lot of time teaching, facilitating and dancing with disabled communities.

==== Sexual harassment ====
Women have expressed feeling uncomfortable on the dance floor and in the community, especially with men who overstep intimacy, bringing unwanted sexual energy into the connection. As a result, some people organized #MeToo disruptions of jams. To address sexual harassment issues, many jams are establishing jam guidelines and instigating other measures.

== Intersections of contact improvisation and contemporary dance ==
=== Similar simultaneous explorations ===
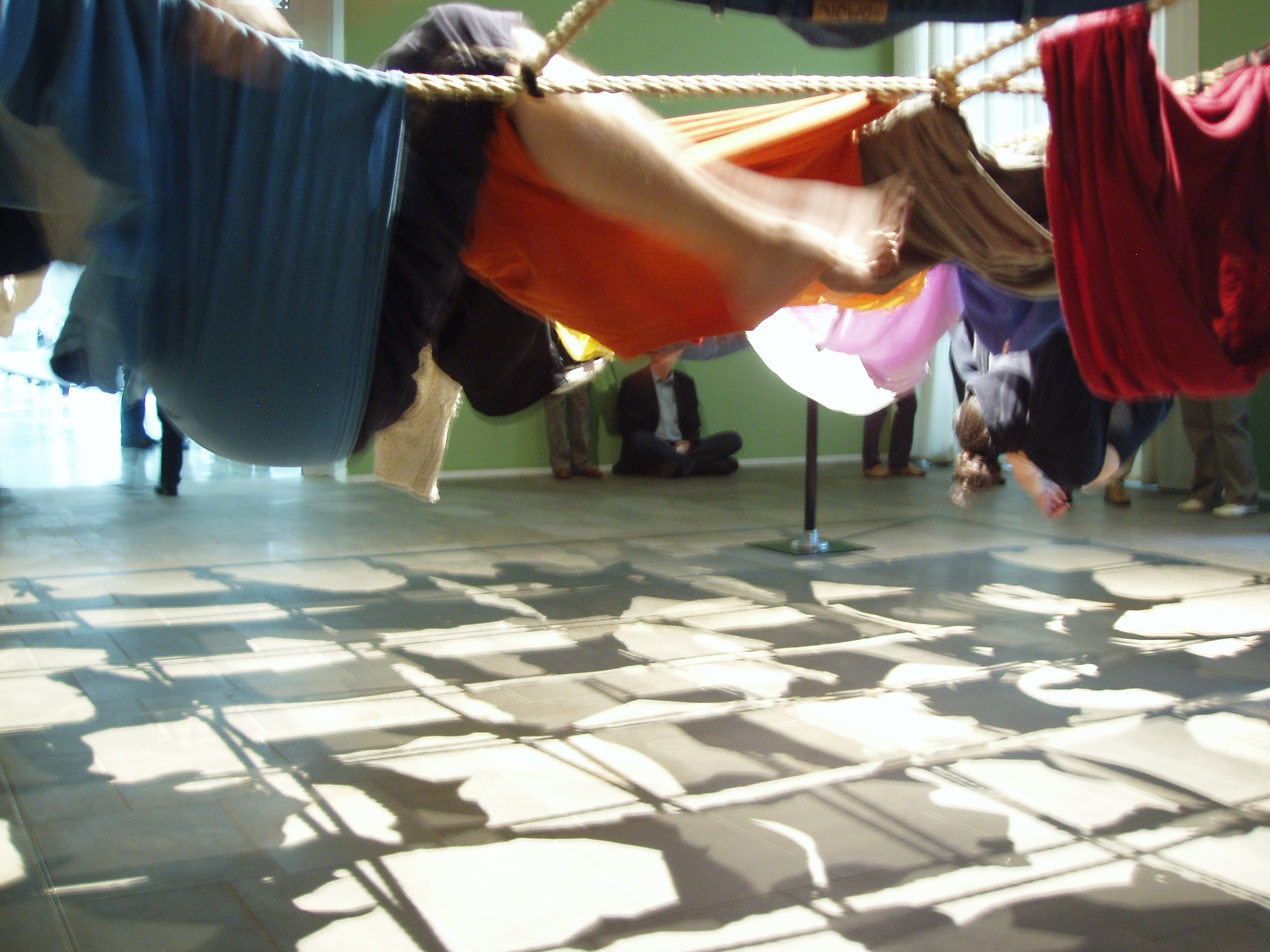
Trisha Brown's Floor of the Forest (1964).

The explorations envisaged in the first moments of contact improvisation are not specific to the collective led by Steve Paxton. Many other forms of dance had also experimented with weight, touch and improvisation and examples abound in the 1960s of dancers who practice something similar, but not as systematic as contact improvisation, including Trisha Brown, Grand Union, Daniel Nagrin's Workgroup, Anna Halprin 's San Francisco Dancers' Workshop, Julian Beck and Judith Malina's Living Theater or Carolee Schneemann's Meat Joy (1964).

Simone Forti, for instance, developed Huddle in the 1960s. It was a dance in which six to seven dancers were invited to form together an agglutinated mass of which one by one they detached themselves to gradually reintegrate it, thus testing the tactile, olfactory and weight sensations.

=== As a resource for movement ===
Many contemporary choreographers today use contact improvisation as a significant resource for movement. This is the case with choreographers Bill T. Jones, Wim Vandekeybus and Antonija Livingstone, or in the companies Punchdrunk (especially in their famous site-specific 2011 production Sleep No More) and DV8 Physical Theater.

References to contact improvisation vary: some are inspired by the qualities of the duet styles involving a specific use of touch, while others insist on the acrobatic dimension of contact improvisation and put forward situations of risk as means of reaching adrenalized states of performance.

Many also perpetuate the work of sensation put forward by contact improvisation while making way for an interrogation on the relations between the genders that contact improvisation tends rather to make disappear behind an equality advocated but not always enforced. Companies like DV8 and The Cholmondeleys have thus produced choreographies based on a similar anti-mechanistic approach to that of contact improvisation, coupling it with interrogations on gendered roles." Similarly, a number of early contactors – such as Keith Hennesy, Ishmael Houston-Jones, Bill T. Jones and his partner Arnie Zane – participated in the struggles for LGBT rights in the wake of the AIDS crisis of the 1980s.

In Europe in particular, many improvisers during the 1980s were influenced by contact improvisation. Examples of such dancers are João Fiadeiro from the Portuguese New Dance, British improvisers Julyen Hamilton, Kirstie Simson, and Charlie Morrissey, as well as North American artists who emigrated to Europe like Benoît Lachambre, Mark Tompkins and Meg Stuart.

Meg Stuart considers her lineage to be in the experimental approach to dance proposed in the early days of contact improvisation history:

If I could go back in dance history I would put myself at Oberlin College in 1972, crashing into Steve Paxton and his students as we performed Magnesium. I have always been passionate about Contact Improvisation. It is rare that something experimental and radical is proposed in a dance studio, and out of that research a language, a community, a world develops. Contact is not defined as "Paxton's technique", it's an open field, a living form.

== See also ==
- Grand Union
- dance improvisation
- Judson Dance Theater
- Choreographic technique
- List of dance style categories
- choreographers
- Modern Dance

== Videography ==
- (2008) Material for the Spine. A Study Movement, Contredanse
- (2012) Contact Improvisation at CI 36, Contact Editions
- (2014) Videoda Contact Improvisation Archive [1972-1987], Contact Editions
- (2014) " Five Ways In' Potolahi Productions. Research Web page
