= Lisa Nelson =

American dance-maker, improviser, videographer and collaborative artist

Lisa Nelson is an American dance-maker, improviser, videographer, and collaborative artist. She was born in New York City in 1949 and currently lives in Northern Vermont.

== Dancing life ==
Lisa Nelson began her training in traditional modern dance and ballet as a child at the Juilliard School in New York City and then Bennington College in Vermont. In the 1970s, she became interested in diverse approaches to dance improvisation, including performing with Daniel Nagrin’s Workgroup in 1971-72.

In 1973, she began a ten year investigation of video and dance from which she developed an approach to spontaneous composition and performance under the name Tuning Scores. Beginning in 1974, she took part, along with dancers Steve Paxton, Nancy Stark Smith and others, in the early evolution of contact improvisation, and was a crucial observer of its development through her work with video. In the ensuing decades, she has worked extensively with Steve Paxton, in particular on two improvisation duets that they performed together for several decades: PA RT (1978) and Night Stand (2004).

Throughout the 1990s, in collaboration with K. J. Holmes, Karen Nelson and Scott Smith, she developed the ensemble structure of the Tuning Scores, that she teaches internationally.

She is recognized for her editorial and journalistic contributions on dance and improvisation and is the co-editor of the bi-annual dancer's journal Contact Quarterly. Her writings have appeared in Nouvelles de Danse, Contact Quarterly, Writings on Dance, ballettanz, Movement Research Critical Correspondance, and sarma.be.

She received a NY Bessie award in 1987 and an Alpert Award in the Arts in 2002.

== Bibliography ==
=== On Lisa Nelson's work and the Tuning Scores ===
- Corin, Florence (éd.). 2001. Vu du corps. Lisa Nelson. Mouvement et perception. Nouvelles de danse, #48-49. Bruxelles, Belgium: Contredanse.
- De Spain, Kent. 2014. Landscape of the Now: A Topography of Movement Improvisation. New York, NY: Oxford University Press.
- Noë, Alva. 2006. Tuning the Body. Ballettanz.
- coloring pages. 2022. Interview with Lisa Nelson on the Tuning Scores. Movement Research.

=== Writings and interviews with Lisa Nelson ===
- Bieringa, Olive and Ramstad, Otto. 2014. Lisa Nelson: How Do You Make Dance? MnArtists.
- Little, Nita. 2006. Interview with Lisa Nelson on the Tuning Scores. Movement Research.
- Nelson, Lisa. 1995. The Sensation Is The Image. It's What Dancing Is To Me. Writings on Dance, No 14, Summer.
- Nelson, Lisa. 2022. Free Coloring Pages.
