= Contact Quarterly =

Contemporary dance magazine

Annual 2010 cover of CQ

Contact Quarterly (CQ) is a contemporary dance magazine established in 1975, with a focus on improvisation and performance. In addition to its periodical publications, the magazine sponsors symposia, workshops, and other programmes to support of contemporary movement arts. It is recognized for its role in supporting the "contact improvisation" dance movement.

== Overview ==
Contact Quarterly was launched as Contact Newsletter, during a period when "contact improvisation", a particular type of contemporary dance using improvisation, was a growing trend. It was renamed Contact Quarterly in 1975 and was a regularly published national magazine. It "collected impressions and insight into contact as well as announcements for upcoming events". Early issues of the magazine are valued as educational reading for dancers and dance teachers exploring the roots of the contact improvisation movement and the techniques of its originators. The headquarters of the magazine is in Northampton, Massachusetts.

== See also ==
- DanceAbility International
- List of open access journals
