= Steve Paxton =

American experimental dancer and choreographer (1939–2024)

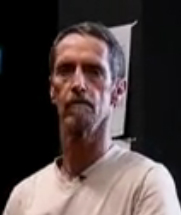
- Steve Paxton 2012
- Born: January 21, 1939; Phoenix, Arizona, U.S.
- Died: February 20, 2024 (aged 85); East Charleston, Vermont, U.S.
- Known for: choreography, dance improvisation, contact improvisation
- Notable work: Proxy (1961), Satisfyin' Lover (1969), PA RT (1978), Bound (1981), Goldberg Variations (1986), Night Stand (2004)
- Style: Contact Improvisation (founder), Material for the Spine (founder)
- Movement: Judson Dance Theater, Postmodern dance
- Awards: NEA Grant (1980), Guggenheim Fellowshing (1995), Venise Biennale Golden Lion (2004), Bessie for Lifetime Achievement (2015)

Steven Douglas Paxton (January 21, 1939 – February 20, 2024) was an American experimental dancer and choreographer. His early background was in gymnastics while his later training included three years with Merce Cunningham and a year with José Limón. As a founding member of the Judson Dance Theater, he performed works by Yvonne Rainer and Trisha Brown. He was a founding member of the experimental group Grand Union and in 1972 named and began to develop the dance form known as Contact Improvisation, a form of dance that utilizes the physical laws of friction, momentum, gravity, and inertia to explore the relationship between dancers.

Paxton believed that even an untrained dancer could contribute to the dance form, and so began his great interest in pedestrian movement. After working with Cunningham, he attempted to remain reclusive, except when performing, teaching, and choreographing internationally.

== Background and personal life ==
Steven Douglas Paxton was born in Phoenix, Arizona, in 1939, and grew up in Tucson, Arizona. He participated in gymnastics as a child before moving to dance in high school. He briefly attended the University of Arizona but dropped out to pursue a career in dance. He lived in Connecticut, and then New York City, from the late 1950s through the 1960s, before moving to the Mad Brook Farm commune in East Charleston, Vermont, in 1970.

Paxton was in a longterm relationship with Lisa Nelson. He died at Mad Brook Farm on February 20, 2024, at the age of 85.

== Work ==
=== Contact improvisation ===
Paxton was influenced by the experimental arts and performance scene in New York in the 1960s and 1970s, and he was interested in how the body could create a physical playground. Contact improvisation developed out of an exploration of the human body and under the supervision of Paxton. Its roots trace back to 1972. Contact improvisation, usually done in duets, pulls elements from martial arts, social dance, sports, and child’s play. Upon entering a contact improv structure, two bodies must come together to create a point of contact (i.e., back to wrist, shoulder to thigh, head to foot, back to back, the options are endless), give weight equally to each other, and then create a movement dialog that can last for an undetermined amount of time, as long as both participants are fully engaged.

Contact improvisation can be done by any person because the emergence of a movement vocabulary depends on a specific touch and the initiation of weight exchange with another person. Paxton in the late 1970s focused on teaching, performing, and writing about contact improvisation around the country and in Europe. Contact improvisation went on to be taught around the world by people like Nancy Stark Smith, who worked closely with Paxton, and by others who had been exposed to it by different dancers, choreographers, teachers, and contact improvisers.

=== Approach to movement ===
Paxton believed that even an untrained dancer could contribute to his experimental dance form. From his work with Merce Cunningham and José Limón, and later his contribution to the formation of the Judson Dance Theater and Grand Union, Paxton was fascinated with the exploration of the human body. His approach to a movement vocabulary included the pedestrian world around him. Paxton described the body as a physical machine that can be expressive by nature and the culture around it. With the emergence of his first dance Proxy (1961) activities in this piece such as walking, sitting, and eating would preoccupy Paxton’s approach to movement for some time.

Paxton was known for eliminating any outside influences that would prevent the piece from just being accepted how it was. He composed a range of non-dance movement vocabulary that seemed to give him a relaxed but authoritative state of being in performance. Paxton minimized the differences between the audience and the performer. In turn his movement vocabulary became fragments of ‘everyday’ movement mechanics and this held a world of possibilities for individual potential. Another piece that showed his fascination with the pedestrian world was Satisfyin’ Lover (1967). This dance was for a group of thirty-four to eighty-four people and it utilized walking, standing, or sitting according to the score.

=== Approach to the body ===
Paxton not only utilized the architecture of the human body, but he also used objects to emphasize how the body could manipulate itself around different objects. He was interested in texture, shape, size, and even how the use of animals influenced or changed his dance vocabulary. This is apparent in such pieces as Jag Ville Gärna Telefonera (1964). In this piece he used three chickens, a full-sized overstuffed chair made of cake and yellow frosting, and clothes with zippers in the seams that could be taken off and put back together in an assortment of ways.

Paxton also challenged the concept of sex and sexuality in dance. Not only was Paxton a revolutionary to the changing world of dance around him but his experimentation with movement and the structure of the human body crafted a different version of what it was to be a dancer. He changed and challenged the aspects of traditional modern dance. Today dancers, performers, choreographers, and teachers from around the world have incorporated some form of his teachings of Contact Improvisation into their studies.

== Awards ==
- 1980, National Endowment for the Arts.
- 1987, New York Dance and Performance Bessie Award
- 1994 Foundation for Contemporary Arts Grants to Artists Award
- 1995 John Simon Guggenheim Memorial Foundation Fellowship
- 1995 another Bessie Award
- 2014 a Golden Lion for Lifetime Achievement at the Venice Biennale
- 2015 yet another Bessie Award, this time for lifetime achievement

== Selected works ==
- 1961: Proxy
- 1964: Jag Vill Gärna Telefonera
- 1966: Physical Things
- 1970: Intravenous Lecture
- 1978: PA RT (with Lisa Nelson, on a music by Robert Ashley)
- 1986: Goldberg Variations
- 2004: Night Stand (with Lisa Nelson)
- 2016 Quicksand (with Maura Gahan and Jurij Konjar) music by Robert Ashley
- 1986-2008: Material for the Spine

In October 2013, Paxton, considered 'a titan of the 1960s and ’70s avant-garde,' gave a rare performance of Night Stand with long-time collaborator, Lisa Nelson in a New York gallery; the piece was created in 2004 but had never before been performed in the United States. Two pieces of Paxton's work appeared in 0 to 9 magazine, a 1960s avant-garde publication that experimented with language and meaning-making.
