= Trisha Brown =

American choreographer and dancer (1936–2017)

- Born: November 25, 1936; Aberdeen, Washington, U.S.
- Died: March 18, 2017 (aged 80); San Antonio, Texas, U.S.
- Occupations: Dancer; choreographer
- Years active: 1962–2017
- Spouse: Burt Barr (?-2016; his death)
- Children: 1
- Website: trishabrowncompany.org

Trisha Brown (November 25, 1936 – March 18, 2017) was an American choreographer and dancer, and one of the founders of the Judson Dance Theater and the postmodern dance movement. Brown's dance/movement method, with which she and her dancers train their bodies, remains pervasively impactful within international postmodern dance.

== Early life and education ==
Brown was born in Aberdeen, Washington, in 1936, and received a B.A. degree in dance from Mills College in 1958. She later received a D.F.A. from Bates College in 2000. For several summers, she studied with Louis Horst, José Limón, and Merce Cunningham at the American Dance Festival, then held at Connecticut College.

== Work ==
=== Dance ===
In 1960, Brown participated in an experimental workshop devoted to improvisation at the studio of Anna Halprin, in Kentfield, California. Subsequently, at the urging of fellow choreographers Simone Forti and Yvonne Rainer, Brown moved to New York to study composition with Robert Dunn, who taught a class at Merce Cunningham's studio, based on John Cage's theories of chance.

After moving to New York City in 1961, Brown trained with dancer Anna Halprin and became a founding member of the avant-garde Judson Dance Theater in 1962. There, she worked with experimental dancers Yvonne Rainer, Steve Paxton, Twyla Tharp, Lucinda Childs, and David Gordon. She also joined a composition class led by Robert Dunn, a musician from the Merce Cunningham dance studio who was interested in applying the musical ideas of John Cage (Cunningham's partner and regular collaborator) to dance.

In the late 1960s, Brown created her own works, which attempted to defy gravity, using equipment such as ropes and harnesses, to allow dancers to walk on or down walls or to experiment with the dynamics of stability. These "equipment pieces" were the first dances to comprise a distinct series in what would become a working method for Brown as she went on to create various "cycles" of dances throughout her career. Brown's early works Walking on the Wall (1971) and Roof Piece (1971) were designed to be performed at specific sites.

Brown's exploration of gravity-defying concepts began with works such as Planés (1968), which was notable for its use of rock climbing equipment, allowing dancers to "scale" performance walls, altering the viewer's perception of gravity and verticality. In Rulegame 5 (1964), she further experimented with rules and improvisational structures, creating a game-like experience where dancers followed a set of instructions that often produced surprising, humorous moments. Brown's work Yellowbelly (1969) included interaction with the audience, inviting them to vocalize during the performance, a radical break from traditional dance spectator roles and a push toward democratizing the performance experience.

In 1970, Brown cofounded the Grand Union, an experimental dance collective, and formed the Trisha Brown Dance Company. Accumulation (1971), which is executed with the dancers on their backs, has been performed in public spaces of all kinds, including on water, with the dancers floating on rafts as they methodically work through the piece's graduated gestures. Walking on the Wall involved dancers in harnesses moving along a wall, while Roof Piece took place on 12 different rooftops over a 10-block area in New York City's SoHo, with each dancer transmitting the movements to a dancer on the nearest roof. In 1974, Brown began a residential relationship with the Walker Art Center in Minneapolis, MN, that has continued to this day. With 1978's Accumulation with Talking plus Watermotor, a complex solo combining elements of three other pieces, she demonstrated a mental and physical virtuosity seldom seen in the dance world, then or now. Brown's rigorous structures, combined with pedestrian or simple movement styles and tongue-in-cheek humor brought an intellectual sensibility that challenged the mainstream "modern dance" mindset of this period.

Brown's Accumulation series (1971–1973) became an iconic representation of her choreographic process, utilizing simple, repetitive gestures that built up over time, forming complex patterns and sequences. In Group Primary Accumulation (1973), Brown emphasized these basic movements by arranging dancers in a grid-like formation, allowing the audience to observe the subtle changes and additions to each movement. This cycle of works reflected her commitment to anti-expressivity and the belief that dance could convey ideas without traditional emotive or narrative structures. Locus (1975) marked her further departure from narrative by using an imaginary cube around each dancer as a spatial reference point, assigning letters from autobiographical texts to these points and creating movement sequences based on this code. This approach brought a formal, almost scientific dimension to her choreography, embodying the principles of postmodern dance.

During the 1980s, Brown produced large-scale works intended for the stage and began her artistic collaborations, beginning with Glacial Decoy (1979) which had sets and costumes by artist Robert Rauschenberg. This period was most notable for the slithery and highly articulated movement style which characterized much of her work during this time. The Molecular Structure cycle, which included Opal Loop (1980), Son of Gone Fishin' (1981) and another collaboration with Rauschenberg, Set and Reset (1983), featuring a score by performance artist Laurie Anderson and a set design by Rauschenberg, solidified Brown's stature as an innovator within the dance world and as an artist of global significance. Three screens simultaneously broadcast separate black and white film collages from five 16-millimeter projectors (more than 20 years before a video component became the norm in new choreography), while the dancers rippled around the stage in part-translucent costumes marked with gray and black figures that resembled newsprint.

In Opal Loop (1980), Brown collaborated with Japanese artist Fujiko Nakaya, who created a fog installation for the stage, enveloping dancers in clouds that blurred their movements and created a mysterious, ethereal atmosphere. Brown's later piece, Son of Gone Fishin' (1981), introduced even more complexity by weaving different movement phrases in canon, with dancers performing independent sequences that occasionally converged, highlighting Brown's interest in intricate timing and spatial relationships. Her Set and Reset (1983), a signature collaboration with Rauschenberg and Anderson, combined improvisational structures with rigorous composition, resulting in a visually and kinetically layered piece that showcased Brown's ability to blend dance, art, and music seamlessly. The work's intricate, spiraling choreography and distinctive use of translucent costumes allowed dancers to appear as if they were in continuous motion, further elevating Brown's aesthetic of unpredictability and flow.

Unlike Merce Cunningham and John Cage, who worked separately on projects and left it to the viewer to put the elements together, Brown and her collaborators worked toward a shared vision.

Sculptor Nancy Graves designed the set for Lateral Pass (1985), which began Brown's Valiant cycle. It used a larger pad, bolder movement phrases to articulate Brown's evolving spatial aesthetics. This led to Newark (1987), with decor and a sound concept by Donald Judd. For Astral Convertible (1989) and Foray Forêt (1990), costumes and sets were once again made by Rauschenberg. Astral Convertible, in particular, originally was commissioned by the National Gallery of Art in Washington, D.C., as part of a major Robert Rauschenberg exhibition in 1991 and presented on the museum's steps, overlooking the National Mall. Performances of Foray Forêt include local marching bands from the presenting city. For M. G. (1991; "M.G." refers to Michel Guy, a former French minister of culture who died in 1990) is sculptural and kinetic, opening with a dancer running in figure-eight circles around the stage, slowing into loping motion down the center.

In Astral Convertible (1989), Brown explored the relationship between technology and dance by using Rauschenberg's light towers that responded to the dancers' movements, creating a dynamic interplay between light and motion. This piece reflected Brown's growing interest in how non-dance elements, such as light and sound, could become active participants in choreography. Foray Forêt (1990), another collaboration with Rauschenberg, included a live marching band whose music was occasionally audible to the audience, emphasizing Brown's fascination with unpredictability and how external sounds could shape the audience's perception. For M.G. (1991), dedicated to Michel Guy, integrated sculptural elements with its choreography, as dancers moved through the stage space in complex patterns, embodying Brown's fascination with motion as both a visual and spatial form.

In You Can See Us (1995), she performed together with Mikhail Baryshnikov at the Brooklyn Academy of Music in 1996. Also in a mirror duet drawn from a solo, If You Couldn't See Me (1994), Brown performed entirely with her back to the audience for ten minutes with an electronic "sound score" on a bare stage.

In the 1990s, she also turned more to choreographing classical music, creating M.O. (1995) based on the Musical Offering by German composer Johann Sebastian Bach, and the opera production of L'Orfeo (1998) by Italian composer Claudio Monteverdi. Brown found inspiration in jazz for El Trilogy (1998–2000), completed her second opera, Luci mie traditrici (composed by Salvatore Sciarrino) in 2001, and in 2002 choreographed the song cycle Die Winterreise (Winter's Journey) by Austrian composer Franz Schubert for Simon Keenlyside. Brown worked again with Laurie Anderson in 2004 on O Zlozony/O Composite for the Paris Opera Ballet. Among her well-known disciples are Diane Madden and Stephen Petronio, Brown's first male dancer in 1979. Brown choreographed her last piece in 2011.

In her later years, Brown explored classical music as an influence, choreographing M.O. (1995), set to Bach’s Musical Offering, where her movements mirrored the intricate structures of Baroque music. Twelve Ton Rose (1996), based on the twelve-tone compositions of Anton Webern, showcased Brown's fascination with formal structures and abstract musicality, with the choreography closely mirroring Webern's innovative musical principles.

Brown's other work include Set and Reset/Reset includes reconstruction elements derived from the original 1983 production which integrated choreography, visual art, and experimental staging, choreographer and filmmaker Cari Ann Shim Sham contributed video design for the reconstruction of Robert Rauschenberg's Shiner, supporting the presentation of the work's visual components within a restaged performance framework.

=== Drawing ===
Though Brown has long been known for her collaborations with artists, it is less known that she has also produced a substantial body of drawings. In recent years she has shown these drawings, including during a major multidisciplinary 2008 celebration of her work at the Walker Art Center, Minneapolis. In 2009, the Chelsea gallery Sikkema Jenkins & Company, which represents her husband, Burt Barr, presented her first solo exhibition in New York, featuring work dating to the 1970s.

== Exhibitions ==
In 2003, Trisha Brown: Dance and Art in Dialogue 1961–2001 was organized by the Addison Gallery of American Art at Phillips Academy and the Tang Teaching Museum and Art Gallery at Skidmore College; the exhibition later travelled to the Henry Art Gallery in 2004. In 2007, works of Brown's choreography and drawings were included in documenta 12. In 2008, the Walker Art Center presented "Trisha Brown: So That the Audience Does Not Know Whether I Have Stopped Dancing." In honor of her company's 40th anniversary season in 2010, the Whitney Museum of American Art hosted several performances as part of "Off the Wall: Part 2 — Seven Works by Trisha Brown".

In 2011, the Trisha Brown Dance Company took over the atrium of the Museum of Modern Art as part of a Performance Exhibition Series in conjunction with the survey "On Line: Drawing Through the Twentieth Century". That same year, "Trisha Brown" was mounted at the Serralves Foundation, Porto.

Brown's work was included in the 2021 exhibition Women in Abstraction at the Centre Pompidou.

== Recognition ==
Brown is the recipient of two Guggenheim Fellowships in Choreography, one in 1975 and one in 1984.

In 1983, Brown received an honorary Doctor of Fine Arts from Oberlin College. She also received numerous other honorary doctorates. She received a MacArthur Foundation grant in 1991, and served on the National Council on the Arts from 1994 to 1997.

Brown is an Honorary Member of the American Academy of Arts and Letters. In 1988, she was named Chevalier dans L'Ordre des Arts et Lettres by the government of France. In January 2000, she was promoted to officier and in 2004, was again elevated; this time to the level of commandeur. Brown's Set and Reset is included in the baccalaureate curriculum for French students pursuing dance studies.

Brown was a 1994 recipient of the Samuel H. Scripps American Dance Festival Award, and she was inducted into the National Museum of Dance's Mr. & Mrs. Cornelius Vanderbilt Whitney Hall of Fame in 2000. In 2002, she was awarded the National Medal of Arts, and in 2005 she won the Prix Benois de la Danse for lifetime achievement.

As part of the Rolex Mentor and Protégé Arts Initiative in 2010–11, Brown selected Australian dancer and choreographer Lee Serle as her protégé.

In 2011, Brown won the Dorothy and Lillian Gish Prize, an award worth about $300,000 that was named after the silent film actresses, and the Bessie Award for lifetime achievement.

In 2012 Brown was the recipient of a United States Artists Fellow award. She also received a Foundation for Contemporary Arts Robert Rauschenberg Award in 2013.

== Death ==
Trisha Brown died on March 18, 2017, in San Antonio, Texas, after a lengthy illness. She is survived by her son, Adam Brown, his wife Erin, her four grandchildren – and by her brother Gordon Brown and sister Louisa Brown. Trisha Brown's husband, artist Burt Barr, died on November 7, 2016.

== Works ==
Brown's works include:

- Homemade (1966)
- Man Walking Down the Side of a Building (1970)
- Floor of the Forest (1970)
- Leaning Duets (1970)
- Accumulation (1971)
- Walking on the Wall (1971)
- Roof Piece (1971)
- Primary Accumulation (1972)
- Group Primary Accumulation (1973)
- Structured Pieces II (1974)
- Spiral (1974)
- Locus (1975)
- Structured Pieces III (1975)

- Solo Olos (1976)
- Line Up (1976)
- Spanish Dance (1976)
- Water Motor (1978)
- Accumulation with Talking plus Water Motor (1978)
- Glacial Decoy (1979)
- Opal Loop (1980)
- Son of Gone Fishin' (1981)
- Set and Reset (1983)
- Lateral Pass (1985)
- Carmen (1986)
- Newark (1987)
- Astral Convertible (1989)
- Foray Forêt (1990)
- For M.G.: The Movie (1991)
- One Story as in falling (1992)
- Another Story as in falling (1993)

- If You Couldn't See Me (1994)
- M.O. (1995)
- Twelve Ton Rose (1996)
- L'Orfeo (1998)
- Winterreise (2002)
- PRESENT TENSE (2003)
- O Zlozony/O Composite (2004)
- How long does the subject linger on the edge of the volume... (2005)
- I love my robots (2007)
- L'Amour au Theatre (2009)
- Pygmalion (2010)
- I'm Going to Toss My Arms – If You Catch Them They're Yours (2011)
- Les Yeux et l'âme (2011)
- Rogues (2011)
