= Douglas Dunn (choreographer) =

American choreographer

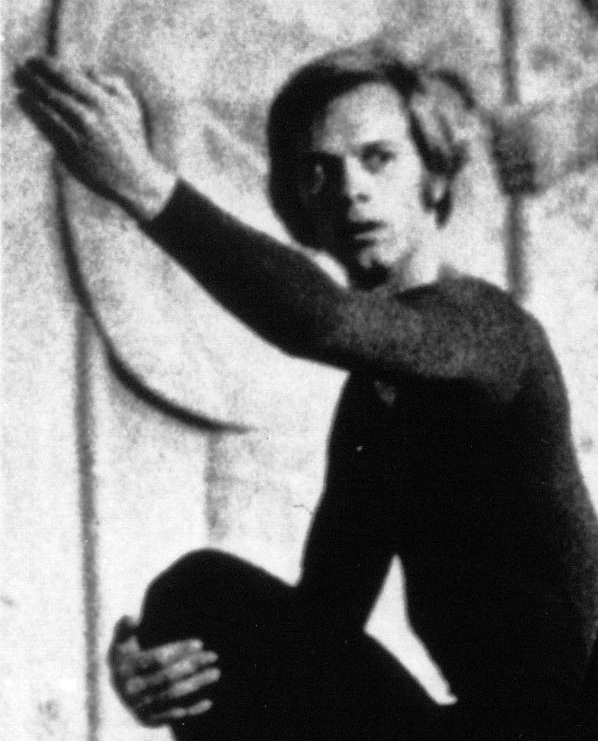
- at the Shiraz Arts Festival (1972)
- Born: Palo Alto, California, United States
- Occupations: dancer and choreographer

Douglas Dunn is an American dancer and choreographer based in New York City.

== Choreography ==
Dunn premiered his professional company, Douglas Dunn and Dancers, in 1976, where he served as artistic director. He was commissioned by various companies to choreograph works including the Paris Opera Ballet, Groupe de Recherche Choréographique de l'Opéra de Paris, Grande Ballet de Bordeaux, New Dance Ensemble of Minneapolis, Walker Art Center (Minneapolis), Repertory Dance Theater (Salt Lake City), Ballet Théâtre Francais de Nancy, Institute for Contemporary Art (Boston), Perth Institute of Contemporary Art (Australia), and Portland State University (Oregon).

Dunn uses many different choreographic elements in his dances which makes it hard to classify him into a specific genre of dance. He conveyed a minimalist approach in his work by using elements of silence, stillness, simple movements, text, pedestrian movements, gestures, wit, and humor. He also incorporated varying aesthetics such as elaborate costume, music, set designs, and lights. In 101, a performance exhibit choreographed in 1974, Dunn used his apartment to create a maze of cubes of rough-hewn lumber that covered his entire loft. For four hours a day and six days a week in two months he held an open studio for viewers to enter the set and explore his creation in which they would find him lying on top of the boxes in a sort of trance with his eyes closed. Among Dunn's best-known works are, Nevada, Four for Nothing, 101, Octopus, Time Out, Gestures in Red, and Lazy Madge. He is mostly known for creating solo pieces like Lazy Madge, Haole, and Nevada. However, he also created many group pieces like Celeste in 1977 which featured about forty dancers. and many later large group works such as Stucco Moon, Spell For Opening The Mouth Of N, Informations, Cleave, Buridan's Ass, and Cassations. In 1980, Dunn created Pulcinella as a commission for the Paris Opera Ballet. He was commissioned by l'Opéra de Paris in 1981 to set his work, Cycles, on the Groupe de Recherche Chorégraphique.
