= Yvonne Rainer =

American film director, choreographer and dancer (born 1934)

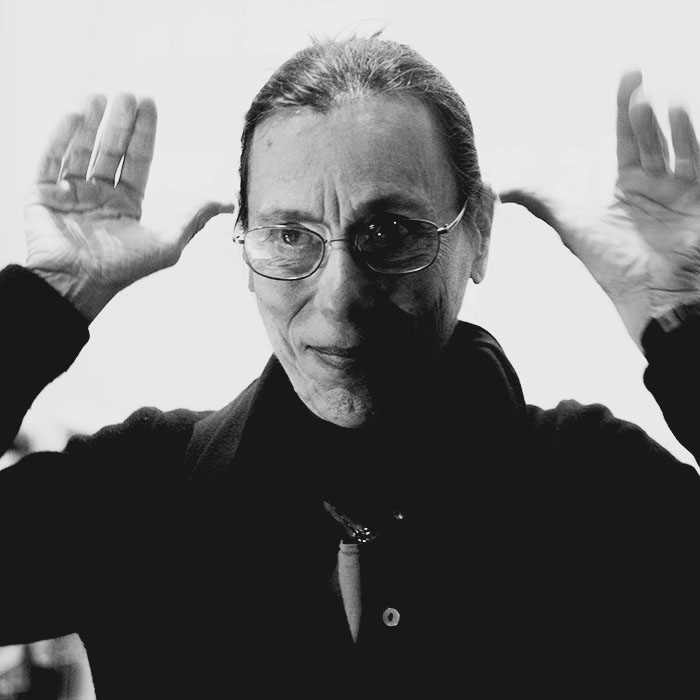
- Rainer in 2014
- Born: November 24, 1934 (age 91); San Francisco, California, U.S.
- Education: San Francisco Junior College; Martha Graham Center of Contemporary Dance
- Occupations: Dancer, choreographer and filmmaker
- Known for: Performance art, Choreography, Dancing, Film
- Awards: MacArthur Fellows Program

Yvonne Rainer (born November 24, 1934) is an American dancer, choreographer, and filmmaker, whose work in these disciplines is regarded as challenging and experimental. Her work is sometimes classified as minimalist art. Rainer currently lives and works in New York.

== Early life ==
Yvonne Rainer was born on November 24, 1934, in San Francisco, California. Her parents, Joseph and Jeanette, considered themselves radicals. Her mother, a stenographer, was born in Brooklyn to Jewish immigrants from Warsaw, and her father, a stonemason and house painter, was born in Vallanzengo, northern Italy, and emigrated to the United States at the age of 21.

Rainer grew up, along with an older brother, in the Sunset District of San Francisco, which she has described as "a neighborhood of white Protestant working class families". From the age of twelve, she was "exposed to the heady commingling of poets, painters, writers, and Italian anarchists".

Throughout her childhood, her father took her to foreign films at the Palace of the Legion of Honor, while her mother took her to the ballet and opera. She attended Lowell High School, and after graduation she enrolled in San Francisco Junior College and dropped out after a year.

In her late teens, while earning her living as a clerk-typist at an insurance company, Rainer found herself hanging out at the Cellar, a jazz club in North Beach in San Francisco, where she would listen to poets accompanied by live cool jazz musicians. It was here that she met Al Held, a painter. He introduced her to various artists who were natives of New York. In August 1956, aged 21, she followed Held to New York and lived with him for the next three years.

Doris Casella, a musician and close friend, introduced Rainer around 1957 to the dance classes of Edith Stephen, a modern dancer. At her first class, Stephen told her that she was not very "turned out". Rainer admits: "What she didn't say was something that I would gradually recognize in the next couple of years, that my lack of turn-out and limberness coupled with a long back and short legs would reduce my chances of performing with any established dance company." Beginning in 1959, she studied for a year at the Martha Graham School, where Graham notoriously told her, "When you accept yourself as a woman, you will have turn-out"; later, she took ballet classes with Mia Slavenska followed by classes with James Waring, in whose company she danced briefly, and for eight years she studied with Merce Cunningham.

In the year in which Rainer studied at the Graham School – 1959-60 – Rainer met Simone Forti and Nancy Meehan, who had worked with Anna Halprin and Welland Lathrop in San Francisco.

In mid-1960, the three rented a New York studio and worked on movement improvisations. In August 1960, she traveled with Forti to Marin County, California to take Halprin's summer workshop, which was very important, in addition to Forti's influence, to Rainer's early solo dance work. In late 1960, both Forti and Rainer attended the choreography workshop that musician-composer Robert Dunn began to conduct in the Cunningham studio based on the theories of John Cage. Here, Rainer created and performed her earliest dances.

== Dance and choreographic work ==
There is a lot of gesture in my stuff—also sounds and movements that accompany them. I imagine what comes across is incongruity, bizarre—maybe odd or eccentric—although I make no conscious attempts at humor. My image sometimes takes the form of a disorientated body in which one part doesn't know what the other part is doing.

In 1962, Rainer, Steve Paxton and Ruth Emerson approached the Reverend Al Carmines at the Judson Memorial Church to ask if they could begin performing there. The Church was already known for the Judson Poets' Theater and Judson Art Gallery, which had been showing the work of Claes Oldenburg, Allan Kaprow, Robert Whitman, Jim Dine, and Tom Wesselmann. It now became a focal point for vanguard dance activity and concerts of dance.

Rainer is noted for an approach to dance that treats "the body more as the source of an infinite variety of movements" than as the purveyor of plot or drama. Many of the elements she employed—such as repetition, tasks, and indeterminacy—later became standard features of contemporary dance. In 1965, when writing about a recent dance — Parts of Some Sextets — for the Tulane Drama Review, she ended the essay with what became her notorious No Manifesto, which she "reconsidered" in 2008. In 1969, her work was published in 0 to 9 magazine, an avant-garde publication which experimented with language and meaning-making.

NO to spectacle.
No to virtuosity.
No to transformations and magic and make-believe.
No to the glamour and transcendency of the star image.
No to the heroic.
No to the anti-heroic.
No to trash imagery.
No to involvement of performer or spectator.
No to style.
No to camp.
No to seduction of spectator by the wiles of the performer.
No to eccentricity.
No to moving or being moved.

Repetition and sound were employed in her first choreographed piece, Three Satie Spoons (1961), a solo in three parts performed by Rainer to the accompaniment of Eric Satie's Trois Gymnopedies. The last section contained a repeated "beep beep beep in a falsetto squeak" and the spoken line: "The grass is greener when the sun is yellower." Over time her work shifted to include more narrative and cohesive spoken words. Ordinary Dance (1962) was a combination of movement and narrative, and featured the repetition of simple movements while Rainer recited an autobiographical monologue containing the names of the streets on which she had lived while in San Francisco. One characteristic of Rainer's early choreography was her fascination with using untrained performers. We Shall Run (1963) had twelve performers, both dancers and non-dancers who, clad in street clothes, ran around the stage in various floor patterns for twelve minutes to the "Tuba Mirum" from Berlioz's Requiem. Her first evening length choreography, for six dancers, called Terrain, was performed at Judson Church in 1963.

One of Rainer's most famous pieces, Trio A (1966), was initially the first section of an evening-long work entitled The Mind Is a Muscle. Her decision in Trio A to execute movements with an even distribution of energy reflected a challenge to traditional attitudes to "phrasing", which can be defined as the way in which energy is distributed in the execution of a movement or series of movements. The innovation of Trio A lies in its attempt to erase the differences of energy investment within both a given phrase and the transition from one to another, resulting in an absence of the classical appearance of "attack" at the beginning of a phrase and recovery at the end with energy arrested somewhere in the middle, as in a grand jeté. Another characteristic of this five-minute dance is that the performer never makes eye contact with the spectators, and in the instance in which the movement requires the dancer to face the audience, the eyes are closed or the head is involved in movement. Although Rainer used repetition in earlier works as a device to make movement easier to read, she decided to not repeat any movements in the piece. Trio A is often referred to as a task-oriented performance due to this style of energy distribution, also for its emphasis on a neutral, or characterless, approach to movement execution and a lack of interaction with the audience. The first time the piece was performed it was entitled The Mind is a Muscle, Part 1, and was performed simultaneously, but not in unison, by Rainer, Steve Paxton, and David Gordon. Trio A has been widely taught and performed by other dancers.

Rainer has choreographed more than 40 concert works.

=== Select choreography ===
- Three Seascapes (1961), a solo in three parts, with each section exploring a different type of relationship between movement and sound. In the first section, wearing a black overcoat, Rainer trots around the perimeter of the stage to the last three minutes of Rachmaninoff's Piano Concerto No. 2, occasionally lying down in a scrunched up position on her side. In the second segment, she moves slowly across the space, moving her body in undulating spasms. In the first performance in the Judson Church gym, La Monte Young and cohorts performed his "Poem for Tables, Chairs, and Benches" by scraping these objects over a concrete floor in the corridor outside the gymnasium. The finale, which was considered to be radical, featured Rainer screaming wildly and thrashing around with a black overcoat and twenty yards of white tulle.
- Terrain (1962) was Rainer's first evening length work. It had a number of sections, including two "Talking Solos", with stories by Spencer Holst recited to an unrelated and simultaneous series of movements.
- Continuous Project-Altered Daily (1970) was performed at the Whitney Museum, eventually morphing into the improvisational Grand Union, of which Rainer was a member for two years.
- War (1970), an antiwar dance performed by thirty people at Douglass College protesting the Vietnam War.
- Street Action (1970), an action in protest of the invasion of Cambodia by U.S. forces in 1970. It consisted of three columns of people wearing black armbands and swaying from side to side with bowed heads while moving through the streets of Lower Manhattan.
- This is the story of a woman who ... (1973), a dance drama using projected narrative texts, a vacuum cleaner, and objects invested with strong meanings such as a mattress, a gun, and a suitcase.

== Cinematic work ==
I made the transition from choreography to filmmaking between 1972 and 1975. In a general sense my burgeoning feminist consciousness was an important factor. An equally urgent stimulus was the encroaching physical changes in my aging body.

Rainer sometimes included filmed sequences in her dances, and in 1972 she began to turn her attention to directing feature-length films. The feminist tone of her films, characterized by an interest in how the female body was being viewed or objectified by male directors, resonated with the feminist film theory emerging at the time in seminal texts such as Laura Mulvey's Visual Pleasure and Narrative Cinema. Her early films do not follow narrative conventions; instead, Rainer's films combine autobiography and fiction, sound and intertitles, to address social and political issues. Rainer directed several experimental films about dance and performance, including Lives of Performers (1972), Film About a Woman Who (1974), and Kristina Talking Pictures (1976). Her later films include Journeys from Berlin/1971 (1980), The Man Who Envied Women (1985), Privilege (1990), and MURDER and murder (1996). MURDER and murder, more conventional in its narrative structure, is a lesbian love story dealing with Rainer's own experience of breast cancer. In 2017, Lives of Performers was selected for preservation in the National Film Registry of the Library of Congress, being deemed "culturally, historically, or aesthetically significant".

== Filmography ==
- Hand Movie (1966)
- Volleyball (1967)
- Trio Film (1968)
- Rhode Island Red (1968)
- Line (1969)
- Five Easy Pieces (1966–69)
- Lives of Performers (1972)
- Film About A Woman Who... (1974)
- Kristina Talking Pictures (1976)
- Journeys From Berlin/1971 (1980)
- The Man Who Envied Women (1985)
- Privilege (1990)
- Murder And Murder (1996)
- After Many A Summer Dies The Swan: Hybrid (2002)

== Return to dance ==
In 2000, Rainer returned to dance and choreography to create After Many a Summer Dies the Swan, for Mikhail Baryshnikov's White Oak Dance Project. In 2006, Rainer choreographed a work entitled AG Indexical, with a Little Help from H.M., which was a reinterpretation George Balanchine's Agon. Rainer continued to choreograph works based on classical pieces, including RoS Indexical (2007), inspired by Vaslav Nijinsky's The Rite of Spring. This work was commissioned for the Performa 07 biennial organized by performance art organization Performa, which has managed Rainer since then.

Subsequent works include Spiraling Down (2010), Assisted Living: Good Sports 2 (2010) and Assisted Living: Do You Have Any Money? (2013), two pieces in which Rainer explores the theatrical and historic motif of tableau vivants among political, philosophical and economic readings.

An exhibition at London's Raven Row Gallery was the first to feature live performances of her 1960's dances during an exhibition of photos and scores from her entire career, in addition to film screenings.

In 2015, she choreographed and presented The Concept of Dust, or How do you look when there's nothing left to move? (2015), commissioned by Performa and The Getty Research Institute, a performance containing choreographed work interspersed with a wide range of political, historical, and journalistic texts read intermittently by the dancers and Rainer herself. This work was presented at The Museum of Modern Art, and later toured European venues including La Fondazione Antonio Ratti in Como, Italy, Marseille Objectif Danse in France, and the Louvre. A latter version of this same dance, called The Concept of Dust: Continuous Project-Altered Annually was performed in 2016 at The Kitchen in New York, and in Marseilles, Porto, and Barcelona in 2017.

In 2019, commissioned by Performa, Rainer reconstructed her 1965 work Parts of Some Sextets. Supported by the Robert Rauschenberg Foundation and the Performa Commissioning Fund, Parts of Some Sextets, 1965/2019 was presented at the Gelsey Kirkland Arts Center as part of Performa 19.

In 2024, Yvonne Rainer's iconic dance piece Trio A was performed several times daily in the upper hall of the Neue Nationalgalerie during Berlin Art Week as part of the PERFORM! festival series. Created in 1966, Trio A is considered one of the most influential choreographies of the 20th century, featuring a continuous, non-repetitive sequence of movements.

== Feminism ==
As a white, unconsciously ambitious artist, oblivious to art world sexism and racism and ensconced in dancing (a socially acceptable female pursuit), I started reading the angry experimental writing in Robin Morgan's anthology Sisterhood Is Powerful and the fiery polemics of Valerie Solanas's SCUM Manifesto and Shulamith Firestone's Dialectics of Sex.

Reading feminist writing and theory allowed Rainer to examine her own experience as a woman, and she was able to think of herself as a participant in culture and society. Little did Rainer realize that her prior choreography was a direct challenge of the "traditional" dance and ultimately feminist in nature. Throughout the 1980s, Rainer was celibate, and she was determined "not to enter into any more ill-fated heterosexual adventures ..."

She began attending Gay Pride Parades and considered herself a "political lesbian". Rainer participated in a demonstration in New York and Washington D.C. to protest the challenges to Roe v. Wade during this same time period. At the age of 56, she overcame her fears of identifying as a lesbian by becoming intimate with Martha Gever. They are still together today.

Feminist Audre Lorde's famous statement posed, "You can't dismantle the master's house using the master's tools." Rainer rebutted her theory by stating: "You can, if you expose the tools."

Rainer was interviewed for the feminist film !Women Art Revolution.

Rainer is referenced in several places as example of artist, feminist, and lesbian in the second edition of Feminism Art Theory edited by Hilary Robinson.

== Recognition ==
In 1990, Rainer was awarded with a MacArthur Fellows Program award (or "Genius Grant") for her contributions to dance. In 2015 she received the Foundation for Contemporary Arts's Merce Cunningham Award; in 2017 she received a USA Grant. She has also received two Guggenheim Fellowships (1969,1988).

== See also ==
- List of female film and television directors
- List of lesbian filmmakers
- List of LGBT-related films directed by women

== Bibliography ==
- Anon (2018). "Artist, Curator & Critic Interviews". !Women Art Revolution - Spotlight at Stanford. Archived from the original on March 26, 2018.
- Atlas, Charles. Yvonne Rainer: Radical Juxtapositions. Philadelphia, PA: University of the arts.
- Lambert, Carrie. "Moving Still: Mediating Yvonne Rainer's Trio A," October 89 (Summer 1999): 87–112.
- Liza Béar, Yvonne Rainer, and Willoughby Sharp. "Yvonne Rainer", Avalanche Magazine 5 (Summer 1972): 46–59.
- Green, Shelley (1994). Radical Juxtaposition. The films of Yvonne Rainer. New York: Scarecrow Press Inc. ISBN 0-8108-2863-4.
- Rainer, Yvonne (1974). Work 1961-73. Halifax, Nova Scotia: The Press of the Nova Scotia College of Art and Design, and New York: New York University Press. ISBN 0-919616-04-6.
- Rainer, Yvonne (1999). A Woman Who ... Essays, Interviews, Scripts. Baltimore, Maryland: The Johns Hopkins University Press. ISBN 0-8018-6078-4.
- Rainer, Yvonne (2006). Feelings Are Facts: A Life. Cambridge, Massachusetts & London: The MIT Press. ISBN 0-262-18251-3.
- Broude, Norma; Garrard, Mary, eds. (1994). The Power of Feminist Art. New York: Harry N. Abrams, Inc. ISBN 0-8109-2659-8.
- Rainer, Yvonne (2011). Poems. New York: Badlands Unlimited. ISBN 978-1-936440-10-8.
