= David Gordon (choreographer) =

American postmodern choreographer and theatrical director (1936–2022)

- (Promotional image, 2014)
- Born: July 14, 1936; Lower East Side; Manhattan, New York City
- Died: January 29, 2022 (aged 85); SoHo, Manhattan, New York City
- Alma mater: Brooklyn College
- Known for: Postmodern dance theater musical theater
- Notable work: (see article)
- Movement: Judson Dance Theater
- Spouse(s): Valda Setterfield (January 28, 1961 - January 29, 2022, his death)
- Children: Ain Gordon
- Awards: (see below)
- Website: David Gordon Archiveography

David Gordon (July 14, 1936 – January 29, 2022) was an American dancer, choreographer, writer, and theatrical director prominent in the world of postmodern dance and performance. Based in New York City, Gordon's work has been seen in major performance venues across the United States, Europe, South America and Japan, and has appeared on television on PBS's Great Performances and Alive TV, and the BBC and Channel 4 in Great Britain.

Twice a Guggenheim Fellow (1981 and 1987), Gordon has been a panelist of the dance program panels of the National Endowment for the Arts and the New York State Council on the Arts, and chairman of the former. He was a member of the Actors Studio, and was a founder of the Center for Creative Research.

Gordon was married to Valda Setterfield, a dancer and actress born in England, who was for 10 years a featured soloist with the Merce Cunningham Dance Company. She appears regularly in Gordon's work, and has been referred to as his "muse". Together they have been called "The Barrymores of postmodern dance" and "two of the most important artists to emerge from New York’s postmodern dance scene." Their son, playwright, actor, and theatrical director Ain Gordon, collaborated with Gordon on a number of projects.

Gordon's work has been archived in the New York Public Library for the Performing Arts at Lincoln Center. Gordon also created a digital archive called Archiveography which covers both his personal and professional lives.

== Style and process ==
Like most postmodernists in dance, Gordon employed pedestrian movement in his work, (Note: Jowitt, Deborah: Gordon makes polished patterns out of shambling, plebian movement. Jowitt, Deborah (May 29, 1978) "'Don't You Wonder What He's Thinking?' 'No'" Village Voice) but he was notable for his frequent use of spoken dialogue, even in "dance" pieces, as well as his Brechtian rejection of illusion coupled with an interest in theatricality. (Note: Banes, Sally: In the debate on theatricality among post-Cunningham choreographers, Gordon stands in favor of spectacle. But he uses spectacular moments and glamorous touches cunningly, often intensifying them until a gap between the movement relationships and their extravagant theatrical overlay throws the movement into high relief. Banes, Sally (May 1, 1978) "David Gordon, or, The Ambiguities" Village Voice) He was quoted as saying "I [want] to use mundane means to a magical end." A contrarian by nature, Gordon creates works which are founded on structural clarity, which he then undercuts: "I always find some way to screw up a fabulously straightforward structure," Gordon has said, "I can't seem to avoid that."

Another of Gordon's hallmarks is his fondness for recycling previously used materials, both choreographic and physical. According to critic Arlene Croce: "Gordon is a collagist. Many of his dances and set pieces ... can be lifted out of context and combined with new material to make a new impression." This is particularly true with his use of gestures, which when seen in one context can appear meaningless or arbitrary, but which will pick up meaning and appear as deliberate when, for instance, accompanied by music or text. According to Gordon:

Movement is ambiguous until you place it against some background. ... I use a great many repetitions with variations to make the ambiguities of movement apparent. Exploring the alternate possible meanings of gesture is one of my major concerns.

Gordon's pieces frequently referenced films and other aspects of popular culture, and are often autobiographical, or at least apparently so, with the distinction between true facts and fictionalized autobiography deliberately obscured. His pieces often employ humor, sometimes in self-deprecation, and he has been called one of the few "comic spirits" produced by the postmodern dance movement.

Gordon was very aware of the people who performed his works, and frequently tailored the pieces to the specific abilities of the dancers they were constructed on. He said "Dances may be glorious reverberating abstractions or eloquent high-class dance storytelling or thoughtful, emotion-provoking nonlinear narratives, but dancing, no matter what, always seems to be about the people who do it."

Later in life, Gordon was to say "I take on projects I don’t know how to do, and I relish the dangerous journey."

== Early life and career ==
Gordon, a native of New York City, was born on July 14, 1936, to Samuel and Rose (Wunderlich) Gordon, both of whose parents were Jewish immigrants from Eastern Europe. He grew up on the Lower East Side and in Coney Island and graduated from Seward Park High School. Growing up, he saw movies in neighborhood theaters and vaudeville shows uptown and watched television, and these influences – such as Milton Berle on TV and Fanny Brice singing "Second Hand Rose" – later informed his first dance pieces.

After high school, he received a BFA from Brooklyn College, where he first studied English and then switched to art under painter Ad Reinhardt, took voice lessons to get rid of his Yiddish accent, and joined the modern dance club, and, at the insistence of a friend, auditioned for and got the lead role of the witch boy in the college's production of Dark of the Moon. (Note: Gordon: [A]s a fine arts major in college, I followed an exceedingly attractive young woman wearing peculiar earrings with live guppies in them to what turned out to be the Modern Dance Club. Being six feet tall and male, I was immediately put into a performance. At the same time I met another young woman from the Theatre Department who got me to go to an audition for Dark of the Moon. Two young men were vying vehemently for the role of the witch boy when I walked in, and the director said to me, "Hey you at the back of the room. Come up here and read." I amazed myself by performing with something resembling a southern accent, and immediately got the part. Gordon, David (January 1983) Remarks made during the "Collaboration: Investigating New Forms" session at the Theatre Communications Group National Conference in June 1982. Published in "TCG Focus: Combining Forces" in Theatre Communications)

Out of college, Gordon got a job dressing the windows at "Azuma" in Greenwich Village, which sold products from Japan. He was to hold this job, which expanded to dressing all the windows in the Azuma chain, well into his dance career, until he made the decision to attempt to make a living as a dancer/choreographer.

A chance meeting in Washington Square Park in 1957 – "a scene right out of Hollywood", in his words – led to Gordon joining the dance company of choreographer James Waring, where he met Setterfield, who had recently followed her friend David Vaughan from England. Waring was to be a mentor to Gordon, introducing him to John Cage and Robert Rauschenberg, taking him to museums to see modern art, and telling him to watch films by Laurel & Hardy and W. C. Fields, all of which influenced Gordon's later works. He was to perform with Waring's company through 1962. Later in life, Gordon was to curate an exhibition about Waring at the New York Public Library for the Performing Arts.

Gordon and Setterfield were married on January 28, 1961, and remained so until his death.

Gordon studied with Merce Cunningham and Louis Horst at the Connecticut College Summer School of Dance, which would later become the American Dance Festival, and in New York took the composition class given by Judith and Robert Dunn, which led to his becoming a founding artist of the Judson Dance Theater concerts at the Judson Church; these began in 1962 and continued through 1966. Gordon made solos and duets for himself and Setterfield, which he showed at the Living Theatre and the Paula Cooper Gallery, among other downtown venues. He also participated in the "First New York Theater Rally," organized by Steve Paxton and Alan Solomon. (Note: Gordon was in the first group to perform Rainer's seminal piece Trio A, along with Rainer and Paxton. Rainer says that Gordon was doubtful at first about his ability to execute it in the proper style. Now I say anyone can master the style, or just about anyone. Rainer, Yvonne (2000) "Statement for PAST/Forward" in Banes (2003), p.210)

Gordon's early works included:

- Mama Goes Where Poppa Goes (1960) – his first duet for himself and Setterfield,
- Mannequin Dance (1962), (Note: According to Banes, during the performance of Mannequin Dance, choreographer James Waring provided sound accompaniment – billed as "Music" (see Program from "A Concert of Dance" at Judson Church (July 6, 1962)) – by handing out balloons to the audience and requesting that they be blown up, and then have their air slowly released. Banes (2003), p.50)
- Helen's Dance (1962),
- Random Breakfast (1963) – in which Setterfield did a striptease, and Gordon impersonated Milton Berle impersonating Carmen Miranda; (Note: Sally Banes writes about Random Breakfast that it parodied the 'Judson Church Dance Factory Gold Rush in which choreography ran rampant' ... Prefabricated Dance, the commentary on Gordon;s own choreographer colleagues, involved improvised instructions on how to make a modern dance. Banes (2003), pp. 13-14) and
- Silver Pieces (Fragments) (1964). (Note: Silver Pieces (Fragments) was performed under two different names, "Fragments" in Philadelphia and "Silver Pieces" at the Judson Church. The evening-long piece was created from odds and ends of unfinished and abandoned solos and duets for Gordon and Setterfield, tied together with the visual device of a television set, but with no other thematic connection between the constituent parts. In 1981, Gordon wrote that for the New York performance: I used my home television set sprayed silver. Valda and I wore tights and leotards sprayed silver and plastic child wigs (like swimming caps) sprayed silver ... [Critic] Don McDonagh said in The Rise and Fall and Rise of Modern Dance that the dance "...was a choreographic look at the ruins of humanity in some horribly projected future." So much for the intention of the artist, or the lack of it. Gordon, David. "Fragments" in Perron, Wendy and Cameron, Daniel J. (eds.) (1981) Judson Dance Theater: 1962-1966 (exhibition catalogue) Bennington, Vermont: The Bennington College Judson Project.)

Gordon and Setterfield were described during this period as "amiable saboteurs ... [with] the stylistic skill of old music-hall comedians ... [and] a wickedly perceptive wit."

In 1966, vociferously negative audience response to his solo piece Walks and Digressions – Gordon wrote that "[t]he audience booed, hissed, clapped, stamped their feet, and walked out across the performance space while I was working" – caused him to stop making dances for five years.

The review was devastating, and I wasn't clever enough to understand or use the possible notoriety attached to that performance (after all, obviously no one was bored) in a positive career move. I had discovered that publicly performing my own work placed me in an exceedingly vulnerable position emotionally and physically, and I wanted none of it. I believe now that I was basically uncommitted to my work and unable to take responsibility publicly for my decisions. I had worked mainly for the positive response of my peers and of an audience, not gearing my work towards that response but expecting it as the dividends of having worked. When the audience and my peers turned on me, I picked up my marbles and went home. I just decided to stop making work.

He continued to perform as a member of Yvonne Rainer's company and, from 1970 to 1976, as a founding member of the improvisational dance group, The Grand Union, which evolved out of Rainer's company and included Rainer, Trisha Brown, Barbara Dilley, Douglas Dunn, Nancy Lewis and Steve Paxton, among others. (Note: Gordon: I spent about six years in a company called The Grand Union, which was composed of six to nine artists. All performances, which generally lasted about two hours, were totally improvised. We didn't always know how many of us would be there or what we would be looking like, or who would leave halfway through. Gordon, David (January 1983) Remarks made during the "Collaboration: Investigating New Forms" session at the Theatre Communications Group National Conference in June 1982. Published in "TCG Focus: Combining Forces" in Theatre Communications) Gordon was later to say about his work with the Grand Union: "It’s about being perverse. I want to do what you don’t expect me to do. I want to do what I don’t expect me to do. I also can’t tell if you’re having a good time unless I can make you laugh."

Gordon credits all of these early experiences with laying the groundwork for his artistic process:

Jimmy [Waring] was an education for me, as he was for most people who came in contact with him. ... [He] taught me about art and developed my taste, but I didn't begin to understand about making work until later with Yvonne Rainer. From her I found out what it is to be an artist – a person who makes choices and stands behind them. Then, from working with Trisha Brown in the Grand Union, I learned how to edit, how to boil a thing down to its essence. Jimmy's approach was much more whimsical. His way of working led you – or led me at any rate – to accept any idea as valid simply because I'd thought of it. I thought of it and I kept it, and what came next was what I thought of next. I don't believe Jimmy meant to absolve me of all responsibility for my work, but I got the impression that wild intuitive guessing was all I had to do to make art. I never threw anything away. I remember distinctly Jimmy's saying, "If you don't like it now, you can get to like it. If you can't get to like it, who says you have to like it?" The point of it was to demystify art and free the artist from the limitations of his own taste. There was a great sense of liberation that stemmed from John Cage's championing of this philosophy, and Jimmy, among others, was establishing alternatives to the kind of teaching that had dominated modern-dance composition up until then.

In 1971 Gordon returned to making dances when Rainer put him in charge of her classes while she went to India, from which came the material which became Sleepwalking, first performed at Oberlin College and then in New York. Gordon formed the Pick Up Performance Company that year – incorporated in 1978 as a non-profit organization – to support and administer his work in live performance and media. His work during this period included:

- The Matter (1972) – which utilized volunteer non-dancers who had signed up at a Grand Union concert to participate in Gordon's next project. The piece was re-mounted in 1979, with additions and subtractions, as The Matter (Plus and Minus), and was later the inspiration for The Matter/2012: Art and Archive, performed at Danspace Project at St. Mark's Church in-the-Bowery, as well as The Matter at MoMA / 2018, performed at the Museum of Modern Art as part of the retrospective exhibition Judson Dance Theater: The Work is Never Done.
- Times Four (1975) – a duet for Gordon and Setterfield in which they performed synchronized movements in four directions; Gordon hated performing it, while Setterfield reportedly enjoyed it. The piece was recreated and expanded in 2025 by choreographer Wally Cardona, who performed it with Molly Lieber. (See Legacy below.)
- Personal Inventory (1976) – in which Gordon and Setterfield each had to improvise 500 different movements, counting them as they went,
- Wordsworth and the Motor (1977),
- Not Necessarily Recognizable Objectives (1977) – for which Gordon won the first SoHo Weekly News Soho Arts Award in Avant-Garde Dance,
- What Happened (1978),
- An Audience With the Pope (or This Is Where I Came In) (1979)

and the seminal Chair (1974), a duet for Gordon and Setterfield in which they perform with metal folding chairs, the use of which became a signature of his work. Critic Deborah Jowitt wrote of his works during this period that "process and polish were linked in pretty paradoxes."

By this time Gordon and Setterfield had developed a reputation as "the dance world's most intriguing couple. Ideal mates, ideal opposites, yin and yang, male and female, total communication." Also during this period and into the 1980s, Gordon, a natural contrarian, did not call himself a "choreographer", but billed his pieces as being "constructed" by him. Although he has collaborated with visual artists and designers such as Power Boothe, Red Grooms and Santo Loquasto, Gordon has often, usually without being credited for it, designed the costumes, decor and props for his pieces. In doing so, he frequently utilizes the contents of thrift stores and makes use of mundane materials such as cardboard, foam core, and gaffers tape, as well as commercially produced items such as clothing racks and rolling ladders.

Gordon's hand-made score for One Part of The Matter – an excerpt from The Matter for solo dancer (Setterfield) – which consisted of cut-outs of poses culled from photographs by Eadweard Muybridge taped to sheets of paper, is in the drawings collection of the Museum of Modern Art in New York. The score came about because Setterfield was on tour with the Cunningham company, and Gordon sent her the poses so she could memorize them in her hotel room. When she returned, they worked together on the transitions between the poses. Since then, Setterfield has performed One Part of the Matter in many venues around the world.

== 1980s ==
In 1980, Gordon gave up his job creating window displays, which for 18 years had supported both his work and his family – his son Ain was born in 1962 – to work full-time as a performer and choreographer. He also appeared in two seminal documentaries about postmodern dance, Beyond the Mainstream: The Postmoderns, part of the PBS Dance in America series, and Michael Blackwood's Making Dances, which focused on seven choreographers: aside from Gordon, Trisha Brown, Lucinda Childs, Douglas Dunn, Kenneth King, Meredith Monk and Sara Rudner.

In the 1980s, his Pick-Up Company toured throughout the United States, performing both intimate pieces such as:

- Close Up (1979) – a duet for Gordon and Setterfield – and
- Dorothy and Eileen (1980), in which two female dancers improvise dialogue about their mothers – which has been called "[o]ne of his most successfully conceived and rendered pieces";

as well as larger-scale works, including:

- T.V. Reel (1982);
- Trying Times (1982) – which ends with Gordon being put on trial by his dancers; this piece and Framework which followed it feature "visual devices" by artist Power Boothe – open wooden frames, canvas cloths painted with diagonal stripes, and painted Masonite boards, as well as a double-hinged construction of wood-framed heavy cardboard panels which was manipulated by the dancers into numerous different patterns which they then interacted with – some of which will later be used in Dancing Henry V.
- Framework (1983);
- My Folks (1984) – set to klezmer music, Eastern European Jewish folk music, which Gordon had grown up with, not knowing what it was;
- Four Men Nine Lives (1985);
- Transparent Means for Traveling Light (1986) – performed to a score by John Cage;

and the mammoth United States (1988–1989), which was co-commissioned by 26 presenters in 16 states and has so many sections which exist in different but related versions that they have never all been performed together. Many of Gordon's pieces from this period had their premiere at David White's Dance Theater Workshop.

Gordon also made work for other companies during this time, including:

- Grote Ogen ("Big Eyes") for Wekcentrum Dans in the Netherlands (1981),
- Pas et Par for Theatre du Silence in Lyons (1981),
- Counter Revolution (1981), Field Study (1984) and Bach and Offenbach (1986) for London's Extemporary Dance Theatre,
- Piano Movers to music by Thelonious Monk for Dance Theatre of Harlem (1984),
- Beethoven and Boothe (1985) for Group Recherche Choreographique de l'Opera de Paris, and
- Mates for Rambert Dance Company (1988).

He also made Field, Chair and Mountain (1985) and Murder (1986) for American Ballet Theatre (ABT) at the invitation of Mikhail Baryshnikov. Murder later became part of David Gordon's Made in U.S., a television program commissioned by WNET and Great Performances in 1987 as part of the Dance in America series. Gordon received a Primetime Emmy Award for the program.

For the Brooklyn Academy of Music (BAM) in 1983, Gordon choreographed Act III, the dance section, of The Photographer, a multi-media piece about Eadweard Muybridge with music by Philip Glass, in which he incorporated Setterfield's earlier solo One Part of the Matter. Also, he directed Renard, a one-act chamber opera-ballet by Igor Stravinsky, for the Spoleto Festival USA in 1986.

== 1990s ==
The Mysteries and What's So Funny? (1991), in which Marcel Duchamp – played by Setterfield – is the central figure around which all the action swirls, received a Bessie and an Obie Award. It was written, directed and choreographed by Gordon with music again by Philip Glass and visual design by Red Grooms. The script was published in Grove New American Theater. Gordon then collaborated with his son, playwright Ain Gordon, on The Family Business, which premiered at Dance Theater Workshop in New York City in February 1994, received an Obie Award, and was presented at New York Theatre Workshop and at the Mark Taper Forum in Los Angeles in 1995. The cast for The Family Business consisted of both Gordons, father and son, and Setterfield.

In 1994, for the American Repertory Theatre (ART) in Cambridge, Massachusetts and the American Music Theatre Festival (AMTF) in Philadelphia, Gordon directed and choreographed an original musical, Shlemiel the First, adapted by Robert Brustein from the stories of Isaac Bashevis Singer, and set to traditional klezmer music with new lyrics by Arnold Weinstein. (Note: According to Alvin Klein, writing in The New York Times: "Shlemiel" is choreographed and directed by Mr. Gordon who, it appears, regards its eight musicians (the Klezmer Conservatory Band) as cast members in an interweaving of music and moving stage pictures, of words, spoken and sung. It can be said that Singer is the original author, Mr. Brustein is the adapter and Mr. Gordon is the auteur. Klein, Alvin (April 9, 1995) "Theater: 'Shlemiel' Continues A Path to Broadway" The New York Times) Subsequent productions have been seen at the Geffen Playhouse in Los Angeles – for which Gordon won Drama-Logue Awards for his direction and choreography in 1997 – and the American Conservatory Theater (ACT) in San Francisco. The show also toured throughout Florida and in Stamford, Connecticut, and was re-mounted in 2010 at Montclair State University's Alexander Kasser Theatre by Peak Performances. This production was re-mounted by Theatre for a New Audience in Manhattan, New York City in late 2011, at New York University's Skirball Center for the Performing Arts, in association with the National Yiddish Theatre Folksbiene.

In 1993 Gordon received a National Theatre Artist Residency Grant, funded by the Pew Charitable Trusts and administered by Theatre Communications Group, to work with the Guthrie Theater in Minneapolis, where he directed and choreographed The Firebugs by Max Frisch for their mainstage in 1995. He also received a 1996 Pew National Dance Residency Artist Grant, administered by the New York Foundation for the Arts, becoming the only artist to receive residency grants from Pew in both theater and dance.

Ain and David Gordon collaborated again on the book and direction for Punch & Judy Get Divorced, with music by Edward Barnes and lyrics by Arnold Weinstein, which premiered at AMTF in 1996 and was subsequently presented by ART. The piece began in 1991 as a one-act television program made for KTCA for their PBS series Alive TV, and had a second life as a dance piece, set to music by Carl Stalling, for Baryshnikov's White Oak Dance Project in 1992. In 1999, the Gordons worked together once more, this time on a musical about women directors in the early days of motion pictures, The First Picture Show, with music by Jeanine Tesori, for ACT in San Francisco and the Mark Taper Forum in Los Angeles.

== 2000s–2020s ==
Other productions Gordon has created as writer, director and choreographer include Autobiography of a Liar (1999), FAMILY$DEATH@ART.COMedy (2001) – for which he received his third Bessie Award – and Private Lives of Dancers (2002), all originally presented at Danspace in New York. In 2000, he was commissioned by ACT to write an adaptation of Kenneth Grahame's The Wind in the Willows, with music by Gina Leishman, called Some Kind of Wind in the Willows. This production was workshopped but was never produced. In that same year, he assembled and directed for Baryshnikov's White Oak Project a retrospective program of postmodern dance, PAST/Forward, which included pieces by Gordon, Simone Forti, Steve Paxton, Deborah Hay, Yvonne Rainer, Lucinda Childs and Trisha Brown. (Note: In his statement for the program of PAST/Forward, Gordon thanks Baryshnikov, "who keeps giving me jobs I don't know how to do." Banes (2003), pp.202-03)

In 2004, Gordon made Dancing Henry Five, which utilized William Walton's music for Laurence Olivier's film of Shakespeare's Henry V, as well as dialogue from the film and recorded dramatic recitations of the text by Christopher Plummer and others. This production received an American Masterpiece Grant from the National Endowment for the Arts Dance Program, and has been seen in New York; the Walker Arts Center in Minneapolis; the University of Kansas; the University of Maryland; Lexington, Kentucky; and ODC/Dance in San Francisco. In 2011 it was revived and performed at Montclair State University in New Jersey, Columbia College in Chicago and the University of Albany, New York.

Gordon has also adapted, directed and choreographed a number of classic theater works:

- Eugène Ionesco's The Chairs (2004, presented in London, Seattle and at the Brooklyn Academy of Music in New York City) – in which he and Setterfield played the Old Man and the Old Woman to a solo cello score composed by Michael Gordon (no relation) and performed by Wendy Sutter both live and pre-recorded;
- He Who Gets Slapped (2004, for Theatre for a New Audience in New York);
- Aristophanes' The Birds (2006, as Aristophanes in Birdonia);
- The Roundheads and the Pointheads by Bertholt Brecht with music by Hanns Eisler (2002–2009, as Uncivil Wars: Moving with Brecht and Eisler), commissioned by the Walker Arts Center in Minneapolis and The Kitchen in New York City, and also performed at Montclair State University. The piece was workshopped at Cornell University, and was later re-explored in Philadelphia in 2014 under the title Political Shenanigans.
- Luigi Pirandello's Six Characters in Search of an Author, plus two other short pieces by the writer, became the basis of Gordon's Beginning of the End of the..., which played for the month of June 2012 at the Joyce SoHo, in Manhattan.

Gordon mounted in October 2012 for Danspace Project The Matter/2012: Art and Archive, based on his early work The Matter (1972–1979), and including versions of Mannequin (1962) and Chair (1974). The piece was part of the series Platform 2012: Judson Now, connected to the celebration of the 50th anniversary of the first Judson Dance Theater performances, and was called by The New York Times "a breathtaking evening of dance that pays homage to his early days."

In April 2013, Gordon was named as one of twenty artists who received a Doris Duke Artist Award from the Doris Duke Charitable Foundation, an unrestricted multi-year award of $225,000 plus additional amounts for audience development and "personal reserves or creative exploration during what are commonly retirement years for most Americans".

Gordon's archives were accepted in 2016 for donation by the Jerome Robbins Dance Collection of the New York Public Library for the Performing Arts at Lincoln Center; Gordon was assisted in preparing them by archivist Patsy Gay. The donation was marked by a series of workshop performances called LIVE ARCHIVEOGRAPHY, presented at the library's Bruno Walter Auditorium, as well as an installation, David Gordon ARCHIVEOGRAPHY - Under Construction in the library's Vincent Astor Gallery from December 6, 2016, to April 6, 2017. In The New York Times, Gia Kouurlas referred to the exhibit as "a manic and magical installation". Gordon's commentary on his life and work is chronicled on his archive website, access to which makes up part of the installation. A third version of LIVE ARCHIVEOGRAPHY, subtitled "Coupledom or Twice-Cooked Pork and Re-fried Beans", was subsequently presented at the ODC Theater in May 2017 in San Francisco, and at The Kitchen in New York City in June, presented by Lumberyard.

In 2018, the Museum of Modern Art in New York City mounted a retrospective exhibition, Judson Dance Theater: The Work Is Never Done, which included another version of The Matter, called The Matter at MoMA / 2018. (Note: Choreographer Pam Tanowitz was one of the performers in the MoMA project. In a 2022 interview, she commented that Gordon was one of her mentors, and that performing his Mannequin Dance while Gordon sang Fanny Brice's "Second Hand Rose" with a Yiddish accent was "the same as going to temple" for her. She "didn't know whether to laugh or cry". Schaefer, Bruce (June 28, 2022) "Pam Tanowitz’s Next Act: ‘I Need to Make a Jewish Dance’" The New York Times) Two years later, Gordon took The Matter into a new medium with the release of The Philadelphia Matter - 1972/2020, a video performance by a "virtual dance company" of Philadelphia performers doing "Song & Dance", "Close Up" and "Chair", which were transformed and edited by Gordon and video artist Jorge Cosineau as part of the Philadelphia Fringe Festival. The video was selected by The New York Times as one of the best in dance in 2020.

On July 14, 2021, Peak Performances released The New Adventures of Old David (What Happened 1978–2021), a video piece written, choreographed and directed by Gordon, which he based on his 1978 piece "What Happened". New performances recorded at Montclair State University's Alexander Kasser Theater were combined by Gordon and editor Daniel Madoff with archival footage and newly shot sections of Gordon, his wife Valda Setterfield, and their long-time stage manager explaining how What Happened happened.

Near the end of his life, Gordon returned to the visual arts he had originally studied in college, and made digital collages on the computer, commenting that "The computer is my enda life rectangle." Some of these collages can be found on his "Archiveography" website at davidgordon.nyc.

== Death ==
Gordon died in his loft studio home – located in SoHo in lower Manhattan, New York City – on January 29, 2022, at the age of 85. He and Setterfield had celebrated their 61st wedding anniversary the night before.

== Legacy ==
In late 2025 and early 2026, choreographer Wally Cardona "excavated", expanded and extended Gordon's piece "Times Four", originally made in 1975 as a duet for Gordon and Valda Setterfield. Based on a single existing rehearsal video tape, photographs and Setterfield's handwritten notes, Cardona recreated the piece and then made additional choreography founded in part on his research into Gordon's other works and in part on his own responses to the original. The resulting full-length dance, Times Four / David Gordon: 1975/2025, was presented in the same SoHo loft where the piece was originally created and performed, and where Gordon and Setterfield lived. It was danced by Cardona and Molly Lieber.

== Reception ==
Gordon's work was generally well received by the critics and the public, although his piece Field, Chair and Mountain for American Ballet Theatre, his first ballet, was reportedly booed at its 1985 premiere at the Kennedy Center Opera House in Washington, D.C. The critical response was more generous, calling it "remarkable", "irreverent and clever", "a mesmerizing exploration of partnering", and "one of the most beautiful and distinctive [ballets] in ABT's current repertory", and praising Gordon's "deadpan humor and ... obvious nostalgic affection for things romantic", and his "energy and wit". However, Arlene Croce in The New Yorker said that the ballet was "the kind of folly that advances to the limit of frivolity on the strength of passion," and in The New York Times, Anna Kisselgoff wrote that "Despite [its] original aspects, "Field, Chair and Mountain" does not add up to anything beyond its isolated parts. Mr. Gordon's ideas seem dressed up in opera-house trappings that hang like ill-fitting clothes".

Twenty years later, Gordon, who had not previously considered himself to be a political artist, created Dancing Henry Five in response to the 9/11 attacks and the war in Iraq. It also received mostly positive critical response. It was called "a bare-bones production that created a powerful epic mood" by John Rockwell, who compared it favorably to a production of Henry V at Lincoln Center. Other critics praised its "humor and deft movement", its "masterful blend of charm and sting", and called it "stunning and provocative", while describing the movement in the dance-theater piece as "stripped down and democratic". "It takes a witty craftsman of dance theater like Gordon to turn a heroically jingoistic play into a wry but fervent plea for peace", wrote one critic about the most recent revival of the piece, while another wrote that "The means are simple, the dancing far from virtuoso; the thought and meanings are complex."

However, several years prior to the success of Dancing Henry Five, Gordon collaborated with Ain Gordon and composer Jeanine Tesori on the stage musical The First Picture Show, about female directors in the early days of the movie business, which starred Estelle Parsons and Ellen Greene. The piece was extensively workshopped and performed in San Francisco, at the American Conservatory Theater, and in Los Angeles at the Mark Taper Forum, which had commissioned the piece. After the success of Shlemiel the First in L.A. several years before, expectations were high for the new musical, but the critical reception was not overly positive – the critic for the Los Angeles Times wrote: "This tantalizing if unformed project has too vital a subject, or subjects, for mere nostalgia. Occasionally wonderful and never dull, 'The First Picture Show' lacks a certain urgency in its storytelling." – and the production had no commercial transfer after its subscription run. Some years later, in response to a question about whether his career had ever "hit the wall", Gordon said: "I died in L.A.", but acknowledges that he then "came back to New York and began again, choreographing for my own company." One of the results of starting over was Dancing Henry Five.

== Analysis and interpretation ==
Throughout his career, critics and other dance artists have encapsulated Gordon and his work:

- Gordon wants to sensitize the spectator to a shifting dialectic between the individual gesture and the larger choreographic structure in which it is embedded. Rather than highlighting the individual gesture as such, Gordon playfully investigates the ways in which a discreet movement in a dance phrase will change in terms of how we perceive it as a result of the position it occupies in systematically varied choreographic complexes. (Noël Carroll, 1978)
- [Gordon] has been labelled a formalist, a structuralist, a master wordsmith, an avant-garde comedian, a satirist, a reflexive parodist. His works are profound investigations of correspondences and collisions between language and movement, examinations of the creative and performing processes, explorations of structures. They are also enormously likable and often delightfully humorous. (Amanda Smith, 1981)
- In David Gordon's dances, simple movement phrases are reiterated until what you notice is not the movement itself but the distinctiveness of the bodies of the performers. Gordon's genius lies both in his choice of dancers, most noticeably his wife and longtime collaborator Valda Setterfield, and in his gestural vocabulary. Also, his use of language underscores the message of his dances, which is that the body's actions and signals, like words, can change their meaning depending on their context. The phrasing of Gordon's movements is uninflected, fluid, tending to slide comfortably through the memory, so that what you want to pay attention to is the very manner in which these particular interesting figures do whatever it is they are doing. (Sally Banes, 1981)
- [L]ongtime observers of Gordon's work would be hard pressed to find a better definition of it than one vast game that he plays with Valda Setterfield. His sense of irony has been bouncing off her level, unassuming façade for years. Since she is always perfectly straight, Gordon's own gift for projecting comic ambiguity in language and movement can shine all the brighter, with an innocence beyond stain. It may be that without Setterfield as chief sounding board and accomplice he would not have developed his double edge at all – at least, not into the guileless satirical instrument it is now. (Arlene Croce, 1982)
- What [Gordon] is, I think, is a plasario punographer: playwright/impresario/punster/choreographer. He's also the dance world's leading humanist. His work has a warmth, a glow, a wry humor and an all-encompassing love for life. The quirks, foibles and impossible complexities of our urban environment are seen and shown as both invigorating and consoling, frustrating and stimulating. (Allen Robertson, 1982)
- ...Gordon, by nature, is a critic. His work both presents and comments on itself. ... Gordon at heart is a vaudevillian, a weaver of yarns, a coomposer of riddles, a magician confounding expectations. The basis of his work his movement. Photographic images, video, and, most important, the spoken and written word are collaborative elements. From these materials Gordon constructs dance anagrams, whose meaning and tone shift rapidly. ... Historian Sally Banes has compared Gordon's work to that of a cubist painter, noting his lamination of images, movements and words. Others have remarked on the inseparability of life and work in his performance pieces. (Sali Ann Krigsman, 1982)
- Formed by the polemical 1960s, Gordon seems to be, by nature, an ironist, with an appreciation of paradox, a fascination with the psychology of partnering, an ambivalence about glamour and fame. On occasion he has revealed a critical temperament and, in postmodern (or Balanchinian) fashion, an interest in layered allusions. He also husbands themes and effects. (Mindy Aloff, 1985)
- Gordon is a true contrarian; he always seems to work against the grain. ... The mythology of [the Judson Dance Theatre] often equates the entire era with Yvonne Rainer's manifesto of renunciation. ... No to transformations and magic? Not for David Gordon. (Although it's essential to point out that his attitude toward transformation and magic has more in common with the work of hip, anti-illusionistic conjurors like Penn and Teller than with the overproduced, mysterioso/glitz of David Copperfield.) Gordon is the sort of magician who shows you where the rabbit is hiding in the hat. ... [H]e isn't the first choreographer to make a major contribution to the theatre. ... But Gordon is the first "dance person" who's as much a playwright as a choreographer. (Roger Copeland, 1996)
- David Gordon is no ordinary choreographer, He understands how to manipulate text and dance so that the result evokes an invigorating place, where thoughtful theater takes on the appearance of being casual. It never is just that. ... [He] plays with many pieces of seemingly disparate phrases before they are transformed into an eloquent whole. In many ways, he is a gleaner of his own work, which he files away with the possibility of revisiting it in the future. ... But as much as he revives material after recontextualizing it, most fundamental to the vitality of [his] repertory is not what the movement looks like or even what the words say, but the beguiling way in which they fit together. He is a director who knows dance. And even though there is a bit of everything in his work – humor, musicality, lush movement – he is unpredictable. (Gia Kourlas, 2002)
- [P]erhaps what matters most to Mr. Gordon — even more than the endlessly ambiguous overlaps of life and art — is the way the present is the echo chamber of the past. [In The Matter at MoMA / 2018] you see younger dancers working on movement material that Mr. Gordon made years ago for Ms. Setterfield and himself; you see films and stills of Mr. Gordon and — especially — Ms. Setterfield.
  And you see films of great couples of old films: Lillian Gish and Richard Barthelmess in Broken Blossoms, Celia Johnson and Trevor Howard in Brief Encounter, Elizabeth Taylor and Montgomery Clift in A Place in the Sun. These screen relationships in turn become archetypes in whose shadows the Gordon-Setterfield partnership (like countless other romantic and marital relationships) has developed.(Alastair Macaulay, 2018)
- "Witty" may be dance critics' favorite word to describe David Gordon and Valda Setterfield. The pioneering director and dancer are renowned for the poignant humor of their work together – his uncanny sense of irony has found the ideal vehicle in her straitlaced, British facade. ... As much a playwright as a choreographer, Gordon has deftly used text, gesture and repetition in lauded works for his own Pick Up Performance Co(s) as well companies like American Ballet Theatre. (Jennifer Stahl, 2019)
- Gordon's satirical humor, impeccable timing and ability to see the stage as a kind of moving painting — and to design it with care, precision and the kind of innate style that cannot be taught — made his vision singular. (Gia Kourlas, 2022)
- [Gordon's] gentleness and wit were always a pleasure, but I think they were congenial cover for deep and sometimes dark thoughts about the world. That’s what made his work interesting. He’d take a chair, a picture frame, a simple step, and suddenly there was provocative theater. He was a sort of alchemist in that way. (Mikhail Baryshnikov, 2022)

== Awards and honors ==
- 1978 – SoHo Weekly News SoHo Arts Award in Avant-Garde Dance (New Dance) for Not Necessarily Recognizable Objectives
- 1981 – Guggenheim Fellowship
- 1984 – Bessie Award, for Framework, The Photographer and sustained achievement
- 1987 – Guggenheim Fellowship
- 1988 – Primetime Emmy Award for Outstanding Individual Achievement in Classical Music/Dance Programming, Writing for David Gordon's Made in USA
- 1991 – Bessie Award, for The Mysteries and What's So Funny
- 1992 – Obie Award, for The Mysteries and What's So Funny
- 1993 – National Theatre Residency, Pew Charitable Trust, administered by the Theatre Communications Group
- 1994 – Obie Award, with Ain Gordon and Valda Setterfield, for The Family Business
- 1996 – National Dance Residency, Pew Charitable Trust, administered by the New York Foundation for the Arts
- 1997 – Drama-Logue Awards (2), Outstanding Achievement in Theatre, for Direction and for Choreography, for Shlemiel the First
- 2001 – Bessie Award, for FAMILY$DEATH@ART.COMedy
- 2010 – American Masterpieces: Dance, National Endowment for the Arts, for Dancing Henry Five
- 2013 – Doris Duke Artist Award from the Doris Duke Charitable Foundation
- 2019 – Dance Magazine Award with Valda Setterfield.

== See also ==
- Avant-garde
- Dance Theater Workshop
- Danspace
- Mikhail Barishnikov
- Trisha Brown
- Merce Cunningham
- Ain Gordon
- The Grand Union
- Judson Dance Theatre
- Musical theater
- Performance art
- Pick Up Performance Company
- Postmodern dance
- Valda Setterfield
