= Ain Gordon =

American plawright, director and actor

Ain Gordon is an American playwright, theatrical director and actor based in New York City. His work frequently deals with the interstices of history, focusing on people and events which are often overlooked or marginalized in official history. His style combines elements of traditional playwrighting with aspects of performance art.

== Early life and education ==
Gordon was born in New York City, the son of British-American dancer Valda Setterfield and postmodern dancer-choreographer and theatrical director David Gordon. He attended New York City Public Schools and then New York University, during which he worked as a stage electrician at Dance Theater Workshop (DTW), began writing and directing for the stage in 1985, and participating in dance and performance scenes for four consecutive seasons at DTW and performances at Movement Research, The Poetry Project, and Performance Space 122.

== Career ==
In 1990, Gordon was recognized in the inaugural round of the National Endowment for the Arts "New Forms" initiative, which funded artists whose work defied clear classification. He then began touring, appearing at various venues, including the Baltimore Museum of Art in Baltimore and Dance Place in Washington, D.C.

In 1991, Gordon began a multi-project relationship with Soho Repertory Theatre in New York City that included five productions and workshops. In 1992, he began collaborating with his father, choreographer and director David Gordon, on The Family Business, which was presented at Lincoln Center's Serious Fun! Festival in New York City, Dance Theater Workshop, New York Theatre Workshop, and the Mark Taper Forum in Los Angeles. In 1994, the production – the cast of which was both Gordons and their wife and mother, Valda Setterfield – won him his first Obie Award.

In 1992, Gordon became co-director of the Pick Up Performance Company, which was founded by his father in 1971 and incorporated in 1978. With the death of his father in 2022, Gordon became director of the company, with Alyce Dissette continuing her role as the company's producing director.

Gordon won his second Obie Award in 1996 for his play Wally's Ghost, which was presented at Soho Repertory Theatre. In 1998, he was awarded a Guggenheim Fellowship in playwriting, which awarded him recognition for his role in calling attention to marginalized and forgotten history and the largely invisible people who were part of it. His work in this realm included a blend of historical fact, imagined truth, and complete fiction.

Over the next few years, Gordon collaborated with David Gordon again on two projects, Punch and Judy Get Divorced for the American Music Theater Festival at the Plays and Players Theatre in Philadelphia and the American Repertory Theater at the C. Walsh Theatre of Suffolk University in Boston, and The First Picture Show for the American Conservatory Theater in San Francisco and the Mark Taper Forum in Los Angeles.

In 2001, Gordon led productions at HERE Arts Center, DTW, and P.S. 122, including his Art Life & Show-Biz, a non-fiction play based on the lives and careers of avant-garde actress Lola Pashalinski (Charles Ludlam's Ridiculous Theatrical Company), and Broadway actress Helen Gallagher. They also included Gordon's mother, the dancer Valda Setterfield, Merce Cunningham, David Gordon, each of whom appeared as themselves. The play was published in 2010 in the anthology Dramaturgy of the Real. In reviews, Robert Vorlicky referred to it as "an act of remembrance and memorialization, fashioned through memories...a scrapbook filled with snapshots from the lives of three inspirational artists."

Gordon continued to write theater that straddled the traditions of playwrighting and performance art, blending fact, and fiction. Since 2005, his work has been awarded both the Multi-Arts Production Fund (MAP) Grant and the Arts Presenters Ensemble Theatre Collaborations Program grant funded by the Doris Duke Charitable Trust, and has included productions at the Krannert Center in Urbana, Illinois, the VSA North Fourth Arts Center in Albuquerque, New Mexico, 651 ARTS in Brooklyn, LexArts in Lexington, Kentucky, and DiverseWorks in Houston.

In 2007, Gordon won his third Obie Award for his performance as Spalding Grey in the Off-Broadway production of Spalding Gray: Stories Left To Tell, which also toured to venues including UCLA Live at the UCLA, the TBA Festival at the Portland Institute for Contemporary Art in Portland, Oregon, and the ICA Boston in Boston, for which he received an Elliot Norton Award nomination, the Walker Art Center in Minneapolis, and Painted Bride Art Center in Philadelphia, and others.

In 2008 and 2009, Gordon collaborated with choreographer Bebe Miller on Necessary Beauty, a multi-disciplinary evening-length work co-commissioned by the Wexner Center of Ohio State University, DTW, and the Myrna Loy Center and Helena Presents in Helena, Montana. He was commissioned by the VSA North Fourth Arts Center to write The History of Asking the Wrong Question, rooted in Native American history, and developed a new two-person play and a one-woman play, as a core writer at the Playwrights' Center in Minneapolis. The one-woman play, A Disaster Begins, is based on the 1900 Galveston Hurricane.

The Painted Bride Art Center in Philadelphia commissioned Gordon to write If She Stood, about the women of the early abolitionist movement in that city, including Sarah Grimké and Sarah Mapps Douglass. The play premiered on April 26, 2013.

Later in 2013, his new play, Not What Happened, about historical reenactment and its relation to actual events, was presented at a number of theatres, including the Flynn Center for the Performing Arts in Burlington, Vermont, the Krannert Center, and the Brooklyn Academy of Music.

In 2016, Gordon's play, 217 Boxes of Dr. Henry Anonymous, premiered at the Painted Bride Art Center. The play explored the life of Dr. John E. Fryer, a gay psychiatrist who appeared in disguise at the 1972 annual convention of the American Psychiatric Association as part of a campaign to remove homosexuality from the APA's Diagnostic and Statistical Manual of Mental Disorders. The play was the result of Gordon's research as an embedded artist in the Historical Society of Pennsylvania in Philadelphia. The play was remounted in May 2018 at the Baryshnikov Arts Center by the Equality Forum to coincide with the APA's annual meeting, and again at Fryer's alma mater, Transylvania University, in Lexington, Kentucky in May 2019.

In May 2022, Gordon's play These Don't Easily Scatter was presented in Philadelphia at the William Way LGBT Community Center as past of Remembrance, an alternative memorial to the HIV/AIDS crisis of the 1970s in that city. The play subsequently had a showing at the Baryshnikov Arts Center in New York City.

=== Collaborations with Josh Quillen ===
In May 2017, the Baryshnikov Arts Center premiered Gordon's Radicals in Miniature, which was made and performed in collaboration with Josh Quillen of So Percussion and focused on people Gordon knew in his youth who are now dead. The New York Times review of it reported that, "The people Mr. Gordon portrays weren't successful or all that skilled, but they were around while he was learning what an artist is and does, and how a gay man lives and dies. By telling their stories — in alliterative, associative prose that can sound a lot like poetry — Mr. Gordon is, of course, telling his own. This is autobiography disguised as séance, masquerading as eulogy, camouflaged as performance." A year later, the piece was presented as part of the International Festival of Arts & Ideas in New Haven, Connecticut, and has since been performed in a number of other venues.

In 2020 Gordon and Quillen began work on their second collaboration – Relics and Their Humans, about the death of Quillen's father from amyotrophic lateral sclerosis (ALS) – during the COVID pandemic. It was performed in 2023 at the Krannert Center, and in 2024 at the Wexner Center, the La Mama Experimental Theatre Club in New York City, and at Arizona Live Arts at the University of Arizona.. It was performed in 2025-2026 at the Nimoy Theater in Los Angeles, by Utah Presents at Kingsbury Hall at the University of Utah, and at the Fairfield University's Quick Center.

Gordon and Quillen's third collaboration, Condolence, or a Rug and an Elf, will be presented in December 2026 by New York Live Arts.

=== Directing ===
Aside from directing most of his plays, Gordon has directed the work of So Percussion, including where (we) live in 2013 and A Gun Show, which was performed at the Harvey Theater of the Brooklyn Academy of Music in late 2016, and works by choreographers Emily Johnson (Then A Cunning Voice And A Night We Spend Staring At The Stars and Shore) and Emily Coates (We and Tell Me Where It Comes From).

== Works ==
- End Over End (1986) – Dance Theatre Workshop
- Epic Family Epic or The Hell Family Dinner
  - (1988) – Dance Theater Workshop;
  - (2003, revised) – Dance Theater Workshop
  - (2007, revised version) – Krannert Center (Urbana, Illinois), VSA North Fourth Arts Center (Albuquerque, New Mexico)
- The Family Business (with David Gordon; 1992–94) – Dance Theater Workshop; New York Theatre Workshop; Mark Taper Forum, Los Angeles
- Wally's Ghost (1996) – Soho Rep
- Punch and Judy Get Divorced (with David Gordon, music by Edward Barnes; 1996) – American Music Theatre Festival (Plays and Players Theatre, Philadelphia); American Repertory Theatre, C. Walsh Theatre of Suffolk University
- Birdseed Bundles
  - (1997, workshop) – Soho Rep;
  - (2000, full production) – Dance Theatre Workshop
- The First Picture Show (with David Gordon, music by Jeanine Tesori; 1999) – Mark Taper Forum; American Conservatory Theater, San Francisco
- 93 Acres of Barley (2001) – Mark Taper Forum; (about the history of Culver City, California)
- Private Ghosts - Public Stories (2002) – Cornerstone Theater Company, Los Angeles; George Street Playhouse, New Brunswick, New Jersey
- Art, Life & Show Biz (2003–2004) – P.S. 122; Club Fez, Manhattan, New York City
- In This Place... (2008–2012) – LexArts, Lexington, Kentucky; 651 ARTS, Brooklyn, New York City; Kitchen Theatre Company, Ithaca, New York; Painted Bride Art Center, Philadelphia
- A Disaster Begins (2009) – HERE Arts Center Mainstage l, Manhattan, New York City; DiverseWorks Art Space, Houston, Texas
- The History of Asking the Wrong Question (2012) – VSA North Fourth Arts Center
- If She Stood (2013) – Painted Bride Art Center
- Not What Happened (2013)
  - (workshop) – Vermont Performance Lab at Marlboro Town House, Marlboro, Vermont; MassMoCA; Baryshnikov Arts Center
  - (full production) – Flynn Center for the Performing Arts, Burlington, Vermont; Vermont Performance Lab at New England Youth Theater, Brattleboro, Vermont; Krannert Center, Brooklyn Academy of Music, Fisher Theatre
- 217 Boxes of Dr. Henry Anonymous
  - (2016) – Painted Bride Art Center
  - (2018) – Baryshinikov Arts Center
  - (2019) – Transylvania University, Lexington, Kentucky); Freud Playhouse, UCLA)
- Radicals in Miniature
  - (2015–17, workshop) – Baryshnikov Arts Center; Vermont Performance Lab at Marlboro College; Bruno Walter Auditorium of the New York Public Library for the Performing Arts
  - (2017–19, full production) – Baryshnikov Arts Center, Vermont Performance Lab at Next Stage, Putney, Vermont; International Festival of Arts & Ideas, Iseman Theater of Yale University; Williams College, Williamstown, Massachusetts; Connecticut College, New London, Connecticut; Fairfield University, Fairfield, Connecticut; The Yard, Martha's Vineyard, Massachusetts).
- These Don't Easily Scatter (2022)
  - (workshop) – Boston University School of the Arts
  - (full production) – William Way LGBT Community Center, Philadelphia, Pennsylvania
  - (showing) – Baryshnikov Arts Center
- Relics and Their Humans (2023–2026)
  - Krannert Center, University of Illinois at Urbana-Champaign; Wexner Center, Ohio State University; La MaMa Experimental Theatre Club, Manhattan, New York City; Arizona Arts Live, University of Arizona, Tucson; UCLA Nimoy Theater, Los Angeles; Utah Presents at Kingsbury Hall, University of Utah; Quick Center at Fairfield University, Connecticut.
