= Robert Ellis Dunn =

American musician and choreographer

Robert Ellis Dunn (1928 – July 5, 1996) was an American musician and choreographer who led classes in dance composition, contributing to the birth of the postmodern dance period in the early 1960s in New York City.

== Early years ==
Dunn was born in Oklahoma, where he toured the state early on in his career as a tap dancer. However, his first training in the arts was in music, and he studied music composition and theory at the New England Conservatory. From 1955 to 1958 he studied dance at the Boston Conservatory of Music and taught percussion for the dancers of the conservatory. The Boston Conservatory is where Dunn first began working with Merce Cunningham.

== Career ==
Robert Dunn first collaborated with Merce Cunningham in performances in Boston and New York City in 1958. He soon moved to New York, where he worked as a piano accompanist at the Cunningham Studio. Dunn had attended some of John Cage and Richard Maxfield’s seminars on experimental and electronic composition at the New School for Social Research in New York City, and Cage encouraged Dunn to continue these classes, which were first taught at the Cunningham Studio. Dunn applied many of Cage’s principles regarding music to his movement classes. Dunn’s students included musicians, visual artists, and dancers such as Simone Forti, David Gordon, Steve Paxton, Meredith Monk, Lucinda Childs, Yvonne Rainer and Trisha Brown.

In July 1962, the class performed their work at the Judson Memorial Church. This performance is widely considered the beginning of a new era in modern dance that was based on non-traditional methods of approaching choreography and performance, specifically regarding the use of improvisation. Dunn went on to teach at many professional schools and universities, including Columbia Teachers College and University of Maryland, College Park. Dunn also served as an assistant curator at the Research Dance Collection at the New York Public Library for the Performing Arts at Lincoln Center from 1965 to 1972. He continued teaching at University of Maryland College Park until late in life. Dunn also became interested in dance for camera, or “videodance,” in which an installation was created with Matthew Chernov and premiered at the Haggerty Museum of Art in Milwaukee on January 30, 1997, a few months after his death. Robert Dunn died of heart failure in New Carrollton, Maryland, on July 5, 1996. He was 67 years old.

== Philosophy ==
Dunn appreciated John Cage’s non-judgmental approach to teaching, and analyzed structure, form, method, and materials over praise or criticism of a work. Dunn pushed students to experiment with phrasing, technique, musicality, and logic in order to develop a new style of dance. Dunn also encouraged his students to create writing that defined the parameters of the dance. Movements were created out of improvisation, and many variables could change the movement. Timing was sometimes cued by the changing signal of a traffic light outside the studio window. The 1962 performance of these classes in the Judson Memorial Church marked a historic moment: the beginning of postmodern dance. Dunn’s experiments with music, movement, and surrounding elements greatly influenced many post-modern dancers including Steve Paxton, father of contact improvisation. Later in life, Dunn became interested in “videodance”, which he felt exposed dance to those who did not seek it out, and gave the choreographer the ability to draw attention to certain details of a piece. While Dunn had distinct ideas regarding composition, he did not wish to define or codify a style of movement, and insisted on his work always being seen as an evolving process rather than a proven theory.

== Honors and awards ==
Dunn was given a ‘Bessie’ New York Dance and Performance Award in 1985. He also was awarded the American Dance Guild Award in 1988, and had a scholarship named after him at the Laban/Bartenieff Institute of Movement Studies (LIMS) in 1993. His “videodance” collaboration “DanceFindings: Robert Ellis Dunn Videodance Installation” with Matthew Chernov was on exhibit at the Haggerty Museum of Art in the winter of 1997.

== Quotations ==
Yvonne Rainer said to Dunn in a conversation printed in Artforum in December, 1972, "I don't remember that your teaching ever insisted on any one thing."

"For several years now, I have felt that the two greatest learning occasions of my life were provided by John Cage, my teacher of experimental music, in the late 50s and early 60s, and Irmgard Bartenieff, my teacher of movement analysis, in the early 70s. In each case the influence was so deep and pervasive that it is impossible to lift it out for objective examination." - Robert Dunn, Strathmore Museum.

"I long ago became interested in this specific art form through frustration at the limitations of stage dance on video (no matter how welcome to dancers as documentation), as well as the limitations put upon the fantastic capabilities of video to present the incredible detail of dance and the human body." - Robert Dunn discussing “videodance” project.

== See also ==
- Judson Dance Theater
- Postmodern dance
