= Arlene Rothlein =

American actress (1939–1976)

- Born: 1939
- Died: 20 November 1976 (aged 36–37)

Arlene Rothlein was a postmodern dancer/choreographer and actress.

== Life and career ==
Rothlein was born in 1939 in Brooklyn, New York, the daughter of Jewish parents Alex and Fanny Rothlein. She attended Erasmus Hall High School and was one of the principal artists at the Judson Dance Theater in Greenwich Village, New York City during the late 1960s and early 1970s. She studied dance at the Merce Cunningham Dance Company along with James Waring, Lucinda Childs, and Valda Setterfield.

Rothlein premiered an original dance work choreographed by James Waring in 1972 titled Twelve Objects from Tender Buttons, based on the book by Gertrude Stein. Some of her other original works include Another Letter to the Sun, a work inspired by Charles Ives and a piece entitled It Seemed to Me There Was Dust in the Garden, a lyrical dance she created and dedicated for her aunt. The dances she created were often a take on Modern dance with an Avant-garde approach.

Arlene performed in the 1968 musical In Circles as Sylvia, based on work by Gertrude Stein with lyrics by Al Carmines. Next in 1969 she choreographed and starred in a new musical Peace, based on the play Peace by Aristophanes. The show played 192 performances at the Astor Place Theatre with a cast that included David Vaughan.

In 1969 she won an Obie Award for Best Actress for her role as 'The Girl' in The Poor Little Match Girl, a new work by Arthur Williams, choreographed by James Waring, based on the story by Hans Christian Andersen. The show opened December 22, 1968, at the Judson Poet Theatre, with music by Al Carmines.

== Death ==
Rothlein died on November 20, 1976, in her native Brooklyn, New York, she was 37. The cause of death is believed to be meningitis. She was married to Malcolm Goldstein, who was also known for his work with the Judson Theatre.
