= Arnold Weinstein =

American librettist (1927–2005)

- Born: June 10, 1927; New York City, New York
- Died: September 4, 2005 (aged 78); New York City, New York
- Education: Hunter College; Harvard University
- Writing career
- Genres: opera musical theatre
- Notable works: McTeague; A View From the Bridge
- Notable awards: Rhodes Scholarship; Fulbright Fellowship

Arnold Weinstein (June 10, 1927 – September 4, 2005) was an American poet, playwright, and librettist, who referred to himself as a "theatre poet".

Bolcom described his work with Weinstein as a "true collaboration", and said about him that "He had such a gift for writing words that were singable, and that gave character. He was more influential on a lot of other people than people have taken into account."

With some frequency, Weinstein's work involved adapting the writing of others. He said in an interview in 1992 that "An adaptation gives you a funny kind of limitation that makes it easier to improvise."

== Early life ==
Weinstein's birth occurred in New York City on June 10, 1927. His post-secondary education was at Hunter College and Harvard University.

Weinstein was associated with the '"New York School" of poets and painters in the 1950s and 1960s, during which time he developed close friendships with poet John Ashbery and painter Larry Rivers, among others. Weinstein would later collaborate with Rivers on What Did I Do? The Unauthorized Autobiography (1992).

== Career ==
During the 1960s, Dynamite Tonite was created by Weinstein and William Bolcom. It originated from a previous libretto by Weinstein.

Weinstein's also created The Red Eye of Love, Metamorphoses, originally present at the Yale Repertory Theater in 1969 and subsequently produced during 1971 on Broadway. With a new rock/blues score provided by his then-collaborator, composer Tony Greco, Ovid's Metamorphoses debuted at Gian Carlo Menotti's Spoleto Festival dei Due Mondi in 1973. Weinstein collaborated with Greco on four subsequent original theatrical works: The American Revolution, which premiered in 1973 at Ford's Theatre, in Washington, D.C., directed by Paul Sills; a musical of Weinstein's translation and adaptation of García Lorca's poetry titled Gypsy New York, presented at Cafe La Mama in 1974, produced by Gaby Rodgers, with art direction by Larry Rivers; Lady Liberty's Ice Cream Cone directed by Barbara Harris in 1974 at the New York Cultural Center; and the San Francisco A.C.T. production of America More Or Less, at the Marines Memorial Theatre in 1976.

Weinstein's operas with William Bolcom – McTeague (1992), A View from the Bridge (1999) and A Wedding (2004) – had their premieres at the Lyric Opera in Chicago. View was also presented by the Metropolitan Opera in New York City in 2002. The librettos for McTeague and A Wedding were collaborations with Robert Altman, who also directed the productions. Weinstein also provided the libretto for Bolcom's Medusa: Monodrama for Dramatic Soprano and String Orchestra which was premiered by conductor Dennis Russell Davies leading the Stuttgart Chamber Orchestra in May 2003, and the text for the composer's "music theater opera" Casino Paradise, which was presented by American Music Theater Festival (AMTF) in Philadelphia in 1990, and, in a revamped version, by Lincoln Center's "American Songbook" series in 2005. Weinstein's texts were also set to music by Bolcom as Cabaret Songs.

Weinstein wrote the lyrics to Shlemiel the First (1994), an adaptation of the Chełm stories of Isaac Bashevis Singer set to klezmer music, and Punch and Judy Get Divorced a 1996 theatre piece by post-modern choreographer-director-writer David Gordon and composer Edward Barnes, both of which were originally produced by Robert Brustein's American Repertory Theater in Cambridge, Massachusetts, and the American Music Theatre Festival in Philadelphia.

In his long career, Weinstein also collaborated with Philip Glass, Andy Warhol, Howard Kanovitz, and Marisol. In addition to his writing, Weinstein taught playwriting at Yale and Columbia Universities.

== Personal life ==
Weinstein was married three times, each marriage ending in divorce, and he had a daughter, who is deceased. In 1997, he was diagnosed with inoperable liver cancer, and received treatment from Dr. Emanuel Revici. Weinstein, who was a decade-long resident of the Hotel Chelsea in Manhattan, died on September 4, 2005, at the age of 78, of liver cancer.
