= Valda Setterfield =

British-American dancer and actress (1934–2023)

- Publicity picture (c.2015)
- Born: September 17, 1934; Margate, Kent, England
- Died: April 9, 2023 (aged 88); Manhattan, New York City
- Occupations: Dancer, actress
- Years active: 1958–2023
- Spouse(s): David Gordon (January 28, 1961 - January 29, 2022, his death)
- Children: Ain Gordon

Valda Setterfield (September 17, 1934 – April 9, 2023) was a British-born American postmodern dancer and actress. She was noted for her work as a soloist with the Merce Cunningham Dance Company and for her performances in works by her husband, postmodern choreographer and director David Gordon. She was described as his muse, and together they were called "The Barrymores of post-modern dance." Their son, playwright, theatrical director and actor Ain Gordon, has worked with Setterfield on a number of projects as well.

== Life and career ==
Setterfield was born in Margate, Kent, in 1934, and grew up in Birchington-on-Sea. She trained in ballet with Dame Marie Rambert and mime with Tamara Karsavina, and performed in English pantomime. She also performed in an Italian revue. In 1958, on the promise of a scholarship to study with José Limón, she came to New York City, following her good friend David Vaughan. While taking classes with choreographer James Waring, she met her husband-to-be, David Gordon. They were married from 1961 until his death in 2022, and had a son, Ain, who carried on the family theatrical tradition.

Setterfield appeared with the improvisational dance company The Grand Union and in the works of Yvonne Rainer, Robert Wilson, Richard Foreman and JoAnne Akalaitis. She performed with David Gordon – whom she first met when they were both in the company of choreographer James Waring – at The Living Theatre and Judson Dance Theater, and is a founding member of Pick Up Performance Co(s). She was featured artist on the WNET/PBS Dance documentary America’s Beyond The Mainstream and in 1987 costarred with Mikhail Baryshnikov in David Gordon's Made in USA for WNET/PBS Great Performances. In 1988, she returned to Rambert as guest artist, performing in a Gordon's Mates.

Setterfield played Marcel Duchamp in the Bessie- and Obie Award-winning The Mysteries & What’s So Funny? (1990) and toured Europe and Japan with the White Oak Dance Project in 1992. She has acted in the work of her son, playwright Ain Gordon, at Soho Rep and Dance Theater Workshop and played herself in his Art, Life & Show Biz at PS 122 and elsewhere. She danced in Gus Solomons Jr.'s A Thin Frost in 1994.

In film, Setterfield has appeared in the work of Yvonne Rainer and Brian De Palma, and performed the choreography of Graciela Daniele in Woody Allen's Mighty Aphrodite and Everyone Says I Love You.

On the afternoon of September 10, 2001, Setterfield was rehearsing for a performance that was due to take place within a few weeks on a specially constructed stage in the Austin J. Tobin Plaza of the World Trade Center complex next to World Trade Center 1. The rehearsal was cut short halfway through due to the rain. The stage was destroyed the next day in the September 11th attacks. She later said in an interview about the attacks "My father was a golfer and he taught me to recognise the sound of a golf ball hitting its target, when I heard that sound I thought that something has hit its target". She was staying a few blocks away from the World Trade Center and saw the impact of American Airlines flight 11 and United Airlines flight 175 and the subsequent collapse of the towers.

In 2003, she danced at the 25th anniversary celebration of British Dance Umbrella, and in 2004/2005 she performed in Dancing Henry Five at the Pantages Theater in Minneapolis, Danspace in New York City, the ODC Theatre in San Francisco, and other venues. She played The Old Woman in Eugène Ionesco's The Chairs at London's Barbican Theater, On the Boards in Seattle, and at the Brooklyn Academy of Music's Next Wave Festival.

Setterfield played the role of Bertolt Brecht in Gordon's Uncivil Wars, which is based on Brechts's Roundheads and Pointheads. She also appeared in Jonah Bokaer's Player & Prayer (2008), with Carmen De Lavallade and Gus Solomons Jr.; Anchises (2010); and Occupant (2013). In 2017, she appeared in Irish choreographer John Scott's production of Lear, playing the title role of King Lear. She collaborated with Scott on the choreography. She then appeared in Scott's 2018 work Inventions, a "Bach-inspired dance."

Setterfield died from pneumonia in Manhattan on April 9, 2023, at the age of 88.

== Awards and honors ==
In 1984 Setterfield received a New York Dance and Performance Award (Bessie), and in 1995 she, David Gordon and Ain Gordon received an Obie Award for their performances in The Family Business at Dance Theatre Workshop and New York Theatre Workshop. She received a second Bessie in 2006 for outstanding achievement.

In August 2017, Setterfield was the sole recipient of the "Herald Angel Award" for that year's Edinburgh Festival Fringe, which she received for her performance in the title role of Lear, created by Irish choreographer John Scott, based on Shakespeare's King Lear.

In September 2019, Setterfield was the recipient of a Dance Magazine Award with David Gordon. The award noted that they "are renowned for the poignant humor of their work together – his uncanny sense of irony has found the ideal vehicle in her straitlaced, British facade."

Setterfield was one of the subjects of Stacey D'Erasmo's 2024 book The Long Run, about artists who sustain their creativity over a long career.
