= Pick Up Performance Company =

Theatrical producing organization

The Pick Up Performance Company, also styled as Pick Up Performance Co(s), is a not-for-profit theatrical producing organization founded in 1971 and incorporated in 1978. Its mission is to support the artistic work of choreographer-director-writer David Gordon and playwright-director Ain Gordon. Its producer is Alyce Dissette.

The company is located in Manhattan, New York City and its productions have been performed throughout the city, including in the Brooklyn Academy of Music, Dance Theater Workshop, New York Theatre Workshop, Danspace Project, the Joyce Theatre, P.S. 122, The Kitchen, the Baryshnikov Arts Center, and other venues. Its work has also been seen in London and in major venues throughout the United States, including American Repertory Theatre in Cambridge, the Walker Art Center in Minneapolis, the Krannert Center for the Performing Arts in Urbana, Illinois, the Mark Taper Forum and the Geffen Playhouse in Los Angeles, the American Conservatory Theater and the ODC/Dance Theater in San Francisco, and many others.

In 2005, it was among 406 arts and social service institutions to receive part of a $20 million grant from the Carnegie Corporation, which was made possible through a donation by New York City mayor Michael Bloomberg.

In 1992, Ain Gordon became co-director of the company founded by his father. With the death of the elder Gordon in 2022, Ain Gordon became the Director of the company, with Alyce Dissette continuing in her role as Producing Director.
