= Alyce Dissette =

New York-based performing and visual arts producer

Alyce Dissette is a producer/manager/facilitator for performing, visual, film, and digital works.

== Career ==
After moving to New York City, Dissette worked in the Presentations Department of the Metropolitan Opera.

In the late 1980s as executive director, then producer, of choreographer/director/writer David Gordon's Pick Up Performance Co., Dissette encouraged Gordon to branch out into working in theatre as well as in dance, beginning what was to become a decades-long "administrative duet", in Gordon's words. She was instrumental in the creation of one of Gordon's masterworks, United States, putting together a consortium of 27 arts institutions in 17 states to fund and collaborate on the piece, which took on distinctly different forms in every venue in which it was performed. Acknowledging her role in the creation of the project, Gordon referred to Dissette as the "tiger in [his] office". The United States project was seen by Peter Pennekamp of the Inter-Arts Program of the National Endowment for the Arts as a new model for financing new works and their tours, especially in dance. It provoked the Endowment to create a new funding category "Partnerships in Touring and Commissioning".

In 1991, Dissette became the Executive Producer of the PBS national arts anthology TV series Alive from Off Center – which was later renamed Alive TV – based in Minneapolis, Minnesota with Twin Cities Public Television. In this role, she produced over 30 episodes pairing cutting-edge filmmakers and multidisciplinary artists to provide the program with "an aesthetic integrity and a visual coherence that it had never enjoyed before", according to The New Yorker. In an interview with the Los Angeles Times, Dissette described her mission at Alive from Off Center as being "to make performance art on television its own art form," and said that she sees herself as more of a collaborator than a boss. "[I]f there is going to be a mistake, I would rather it be with somebody who is talented," she said.

Notable films presented by the program under Dissette include "Praise House" (1991), Words in Your Face (1991), "Ambition" (1992), Punch and Judy Get Divorced (1992), and Seven Deadly Sins (1993).

Dissette was Director of "New Voices, New Visions", one of the first international digital artworks competitions; sponsored by Paul Allen, the CD-ROM publisher Voyager Company, and Wired magazinewith winning artist works presented by Lincoln Center for the Performing Arts.

In 2002, Dissette returned to the Pick Up Performance Co. to continue producing the work of David Gordon – as well as that of his son, writer/actor/director Ain Gordon – raising funds, coordinating logistics and providing marketing for nearly 50 productions at such venues as the Barbican Centre in London; the Brooklyn Academy of Music (BAM), The Kitchen and the Baryshnikov Arts Center in New York; the UCLA Center for the Art of Performance, the Krannert Center of the University of Illinois Urbana-Champaign, and other major universities and performing arts venues in the United States.

Dissette has served on the Board of Directors of Dance/USA, the Alliance of Resident Theatres/New York (ART/NY) and ODC in San Francisco. She has worked with artists such as filmmakers Charles Burnett, Julie Dash, and François Girard, visual artist James Turrell, author Art Spiegelman, and in the performing arts, choreographer Sir Richard Alston, dancer/producer Mikhail Baryshnikov, director and writer Karin Coonrod, composer Philip Glass, singer Nona Hendryx, performance artist John Kelly, dance companies Urban Bush Women, ODC San Francisco, and director Robert Wilson.

Beginning in 2014, Dissette initiated the transfer of David Gordon's extensive archives to the New York Public Library for the Performing Arts at Lincoln Center. Gordon did not want a "boring and tedious" archive, but desired a "living archive" which moved across different formats, so in addition to the papers, photographs and mementos documented by archivist Patsy Gay, which went into the library's permanent collection and online, Dissette worked with the Library to enable Gordon to create a series of performances called Live Archiveograpahy which were presented in the Library's Bruno Walter Auditorium, and later at The Kitchen and elsewhere. He also designed an exhibition for the Library called "David Gordon: Archiveography — Under Construction" which The New York Times called "a manic and magical installation [which is] like standing in the middle of a collage." The final part of the archive is a website, "Archiveography - Under Construction", written in large part by Gordon but compiled, formatted and edited by Dissette, Gay and Jan Schmidt, a former curator for the Library. With the death of David Gordon in 2022 she continues with the Pick Up Performance Co. to produce Ain Gordon's works.
