= Shlemiel the First (musical) =

- Music: Hankus Netsky; Zalmen Mlotek (additional music)
- Lyrics: Arnold Weinstein
- Book: Robert Brustein; David Gordon (edited by)
- Basis: the stories of Isaac Bashevis Singer
- Productions: 1994 Cambridge, MA other productions

Shlemiel the First is a musical adaptation of the "Chelm stories" (including When Shlemiel Went to Warsaw) of Isaac Bashevis Singer about the supposedly wise men of that legendary town, and a fool named Shlemiel. It was conceived and adapted by Robert Brustein, with lyrics by Arnold Weinstein and music based on traditional klezmer music and Yiddish theater songs by Hankus Netsky of the Klezmer Conservatory Band and Zalmen Mlotek, who wrote additional music and arrangements, and served as the musical director of the original production. Singer had written a non-musical theatrical adaptation of the stories, Shlemiel the First, which Brustein produced in 1974 when he was the artistic director of Yale Repertory Theater in New Haven, and this served to provide the basic material for the musical.

The musical was originally co-produced in 1994 by Brustein's American Repertory Theatre in Cambridge, Massachusetts and the American Music Theatre Festival in Philadelphia, and was directed, choreographed and edited by David Gordon, who one critic referred to as the "auteur" of the production. Critic John Lahr, writing in The New Yorker about the show in its run at ART, said that Gordon's "fresh and elegant production ... filters a traditional tale through an avant-garde aesthetic" and has "an element of wonder. In fact, it dares the musical to go back to its beginnings and start again."

The original production subsequently played at the Lincoln Center Serious Fun Festival, the American Conservatory Theater in San Francisco, the Geffen Playhouse in Los Angeles – where it earned Gordon Drama-Logue Awards for Outstanding Direction and Choreography – and also toured theatres on the east coast of Florida and in Stamford, Connecticut. A planned Broadway booking by Alexander H. Cohen did not come about.

Subsequent to the last presentation of the original production in 1997, new productions of the play were mounted in 2000 by the Pegasus Players in Chicago, and by Theater J in Washington, D.C. in the 2007–2008 season.

In January 2010, the original David Gordon production, utilizing the original set and costumes designs by Robert Israel and Catherine Zuber, respectively, was remounted at the Alexander Kasser Theatre of Montclair State University in Montclair, New Jersey, as a co-production of Jedediah Wheeler's Peak Performances and the National Yiddish Theater Folksbiene. That production was remounted under the auspices of Theatre for a New Audience for performances at New York University's Skirball Center in December 2011.
