= Judson Dance Theater =

New York collective, 1962–1964

Judson Dance Theater was a collective of dancers, composers, and visual artists who performed at the Judson Memorial Church in Greenwich Village, Manhattan New York City between 1962 and 1964. The artists involved were avant garde experimentalists who rejected the confines of Modern dance practice and theory, inventing as they did the precepts of Postmodern dance.

== History ==
Judson Dance Theater grew out of a composition class held at Merce Cunningham's studio, taught by Robert Dunn, a musician who had studied experimental music theory with John Cage. A Concert of Dance, the first Judson concert, took place on July 6, 1962, and included the work of 14 choreographers performed by 17 people, some of whom were students in the Dunn composition class. Other performers in the concert were members of the Merce Cunningham Dance Company, as well as visual artists, filmmakers, and composers. The concert included works by Yvonne Rainer, Steve Paxton, David Gordon, Alex and Deborah Hay, Fred Herko, Elaine Summers, William Davis, and Ruth Emerson.

Beginning in the Fall of 1962, the group held weekly workshops at which they performed and received critiques. These meetings were held first at Yvonne Rainer's studio, then at the Judson Memorial Church. Throughout the next two years, nearly two hundred works were presented by the collective. The name Judson Dance Theater was adopted in April 1963. Members also independently participated in performance and multimedia art installations, or "Happenings", which took place around the city at that time.

American artists notable for their contributions or influence to the Judson Dance Theater were painter Robert Rauschenberg, conceptual artists Robert Morris and Andy Warhol, and composer John Herbert McDowell. Choreographers who influenced the group included Merce Cunningham, Simone Forti, Anna Halprin, and James Waring, among others.

== Artistic philosophy ==
Yvonne Rainer's "No Manifesto", in which she rejects any confines to technique, thrill, spectacle, glamour, or assumed space, is a prime example of many of the artistic intentions of the cooperative: a rejection of spectacular, virtuosic, narrative, and expressive choreographic approaches. The collective was a place for collaboration between artists in fields such as, dance, writing, film, music and multi-media.

Although the collective remained in an undefined state, certain recurring themes and methods emerged from the work at Judson Dance Theater. Democratic structures, improvisational methods, and a focus on process rather than product defined the group’s identity. Drawing inspiration from everyday actions like walking and sitting, the artists aimed to dissolve the line between art and daily life. Ordinary gestures pursued a straightforward, unembellished rapport with their audience, using simplicity to emphasize the authenticity of their movements. The Judson Dance Theater’s aesthetic was “never monolithic; it was deliberately undefined and unrestricted.”

Yvonne Rainer’s Trio A, welcomed "anyone who wanted to learn it, skilled and unskilled, trained and untrained, professional and amateur". By making Trio A available to anyone interested, Rainer questioned the exclusivity of traditional dance and reflected Judson’s inclusive, experimental attitude. This gesture suggested a new perspective on dance training, emphasizing the value of participation and accessibility. Rainer’s openness to teaching Trio A to a wide audience highlighted Judson’s emphasis on experimentation over perfection, fostering an inclusive atmosphere that aligned with the era’s social and political climate.

The collective nature of Judson further distinguished it from many other dance companies of the time, which tended to center on the vision of a single artistic director. Judson’s democratic structure encouraged shared authority and collaboration, with each artist contributing unique ideas. This approach allowed artists to exist as collaborators and experiments without strict adherence to a singular aesthetic or hierarchy. Judson at its core questioned the traditional role of the choreographer as the central voice in dance works and instead valued communal methods to create work.

Judson Dance Theater’s practices around democratic structures, improvisation, and the use of untrained performers contributed to a broader rethinking of dance’s boundaries. By prioritizing process and integrating everyday movement, Judson artists prompted reflections on accessibility, collaboration, and the role of art in everyday life. These early experiments remain significant in understanding the evolution of contemporary dance and performance practices.

== Legacy ==
In 1964 when the company performances ceased, the legacy of the group continued as individual members continued to create work that upheld the group's fundamental philosophies. For instance, James Waring and his dancers continued presenting work, as well as original members and second generation Judson performers. Perhaps the most influential aspect of Judson's legacy was not the work they produced, but the lens through which they regarded their work, which promoted the concept that anything could be looked at as dance.

In 2012, 50 years after the first Judson Dance Theater performance, Danspace Project presented the series Platform 2012: Judson Now, which featured "work by Judson-era artists reflecting their current artistic interests and includ[ing] artists who influenced Judson pre-1962 and contemporary artists who claim Judson as a direct point of reference." In 2018, the Museum of Modern Art mounted a retrospective exhibition, Judson Dance Theater: The Work Is Never Done, which included the work of Yvonne Rainer, Deborah Hay, David Gordon, Lucinda Childs, Steve Paxton, and Trisha Brown, among others.

== Influence ==
Developments in dance practice that can be traced back to the Judson Dance Theater include:

- Contact improvisation
- Dance improvisation
- Dance for camera

== Performers ==
Some of the notable artists who were part of the Judson Dance Theater were:

- Trisha Brown
- Lucinda Childs
- Philip Corner
- Judith Dunn
- Malcolm Goldstein
- David Gordon
- Sally Gross
- Deborah Hay
- Fred Herko
- Tony Holder
- Meredith Monk
- Mary Overlie
- Aileen Passloff
- Steve Paxton
- Yvonne Rainer
- Arlene Rothlein
- Carolee Schneemann
- Valda Setterfield
- Elaine Summers
- James Waring

== See also ==
- Dance of the United States
- Grand Union (dance group)
- Postmodern dance
