= Frida (opera) =

Opera by Robert Xavier Rodriguez

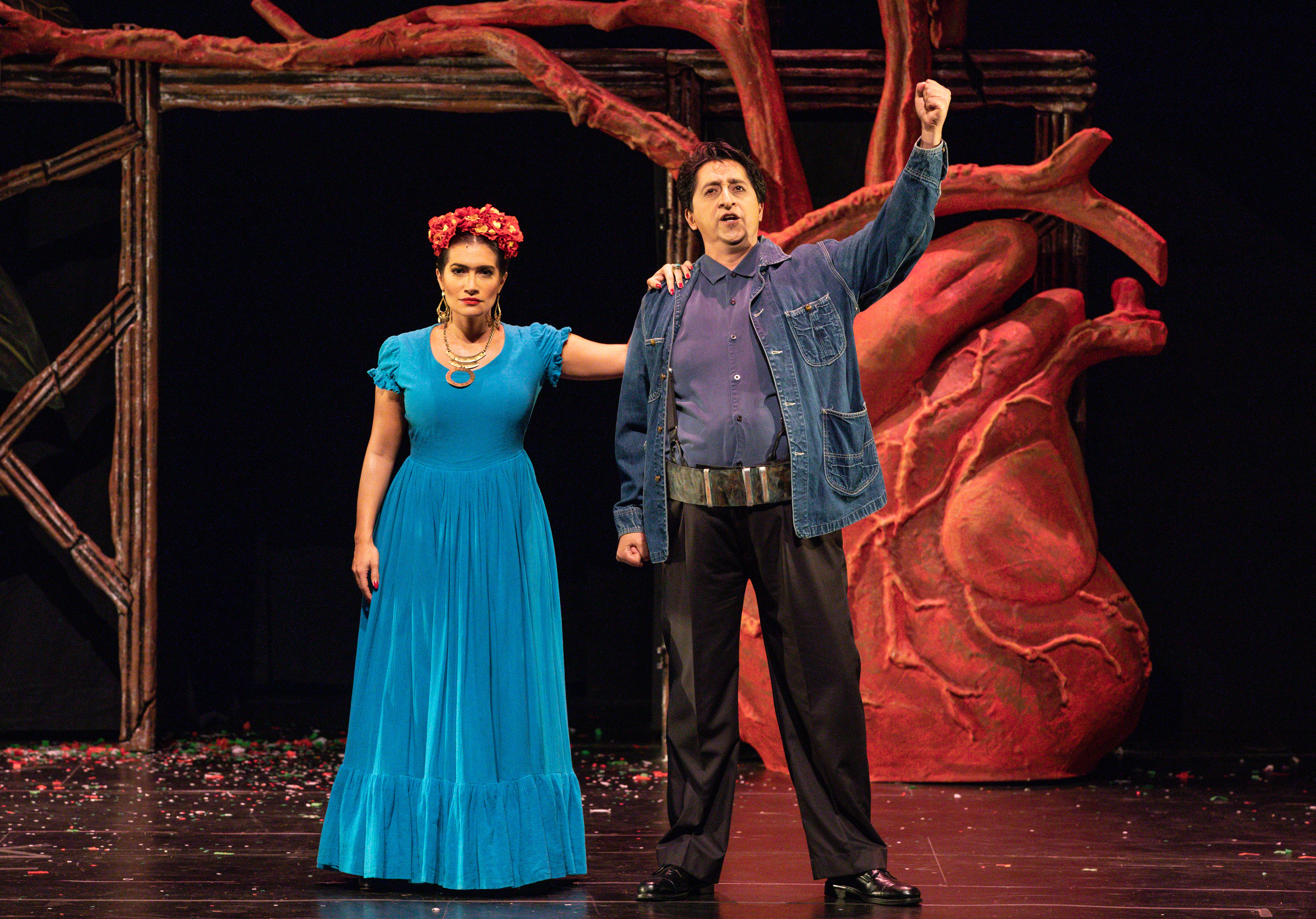
Scene with Catalina Cuervo and Ricardo Herrera from the production of Frida at Florida Grand Opera

Frida is a 1991 opera based on the life of Mexican painter Frida Kahlo with music by Robert Xavier Rodriguez, book by Hilary Blecher, lyrics and monologues by Migdalia Cruz, conceived by Hilary Blecher.

== Performances ==
Frida was commissioned by the American Music Theater Festival (now Prince Music Theater) and premiered in Philadelphia in 1991, starring Helen Schneider as Frida Kahlo. It was revised in 1993, and has subsequently been produced at American Repertory Theater (Boston), the Brooklyn Academy of Music, City Summer Opera (San Francisco), the Houston Grand Opera, the Vienna Schauspielhaus, in Recklinghausen and Nordhausen (Germany), and by the Society for New Music (Syracuse, New York).

In 2007, to celebrate the 110th anniversary of Kahlo's birth, the opera was produced at the 10th Festival Cultural de Mayo in Guadalajara in a Spanish translation by Josefina Garcia. Original Cast: Helen Schneider (Frida Kahlo); Marc Krause (Diego Rivera); Karen Hale (Mother/Lupe Rivera/Mrs. Rockefeller/Mrs. Trotsky); Alba Quezada (Cristina Kahlo/Mrs. Ford); David Toney (Mr. Kahlo/Mr. Rockefeller/A. Cachucha/Edward G. Robinson/Petate Vendor).

In 2015, Michigan Opera Theater produced a revival of the work directed by José Maria Condemi. Starring Catalina Cuervo as Frida Kahlo and Ricardo Herrera in the role of Diego Rivera.

Colombian American Soprano Catalina Cuervo has sung the role of Frida for Cincinnati Opera (2017), Florida Grand Opera (2019), Atlanta Opera (2019), Anchorage Opera (2020) and Portland Opera (2021).

== Recordings ==
- Musical Theater Works Concert Suite from Frida – Angelina Réaux, Soprano; Voices of Change; Robert Xavier Rodríguez, Conductor CRI, CD824
