= Lucinda Childs =

American postmodern dancer and choreographer

- Born: June 26, 1940 (age 86); New York City, U.S.
- Education: Colorado College
- Known for: Dancer, choreographer

Lucinda Childs (born June 26, 1940) is an American postmodern dancer and choreographer. Her compositions are known for their minimalistic movements yet complex transitions. Childs is most famous for being able to turn the slightest movements into intricate choreography. Through her use of patterns, repetition, dialect, and technology, she has created a unique style of choreography that embraces experimentation and transdisciplinarity.

== Personal life and early career ==
Lucinda Childs was born in New York City. She began dancing at the age of six at the King-Coit School. At age eleven, Childs was introduced to Tanaquil LeClercq from the New York City Ballet. LeClercq had inspired Childs to pursue dance, but Childs found that she could not execute everything perfectly. When she met the actress Mildred Dunnock, her ambition shifted to becoming an actress.

Continuing her dance training, she studied with Harriet Ann Gray and Helen Tamiris at the Perry-Mansfield of Theatre and Dance. Childs also worked with theater director Barney Brown from the Pasadena Play-House. During her second year at Perry-Mansfield, Childs auditioned for Tamiris and was cast in a trio with Daniel Nagrin. In the summer of 1959, Childs went to Colorado College to continue studying dance and composition with Hanya Holm. This is where she meet Merce Cunningham and began to focus exclusively on dance.

As a musical choreographer, Tamiris gave Childs her first acting job which proved to be a frightening experience for Childs. After this traumatic experience, Childs decided to focus on dance and pursued a Bachelor of Arts degree in dance. She was able to broaden her technical experience by studying with Judith Dunn, Bessie Schonberg and Merce Cunningham. Childs describes Cunningham saying that he "elucidated a kind of particularity and clarity in dance that felt distinctly separate from anything I had experienced up to that point". While studying at the Cunningham studio, Childs was introduced to Yvonne Rainer who encouraged Childs to show her early works at the weekly Judson workshops. During one of these workshops Childs performed a solo, Pastime (1963), at the Judson Memorial Church. Rainer was also the one to encourage Childs to be a part of the Judson Dance Theater in 1963 with dancers such as James Waring, Valda Setterfield, and Arlene Rothlein. Here, Childs worked primarily as a soloist and was allowed to explore and experiment with her own dance style and choreography. Childs states, "Judson made me interested in dance, but it also made me feel torn between different things – technique, working outside the dance vocabulary, using objects and texts."

== Later career and acting ==
Lucinda Childs choreographed steadily until 1968 when she decided to take a break and focus on her own style of dance. During this break, she experimented with her choreography exploring different methods.

After opening her own dance company, The Lucinda Dance Company in 1973, Childs collaborated with the likes of Robert Wilson and Philip Glass. Childs, Glass and Wilson joined together on the opera Einstein On The Beach. Childs participated as the leading performer and choreographer and won an Obie Award for Best Actress for her performance. She also appeared in a show titled I Was Sitting on My Patio This Guy Appeared I Thought I Was Hallucinating in 1977. Childs also originated the role of Hubert Page in The Singular Life of Albert Nobbs Off-Broadway in 1982. Janet McTeer would later go on to receive an Academy Award nomination for playing the role opposite Glenn Close.

Since 1992, Childs has worked primarily in the field of opera, starting with Luc Bondy's production of Richard Strauss's Salome. She also choreographed Bondy's production of Macbeth for the Scottish Opera in 1995. That same year, Childs directed her first opera, a production of Mozart's Zaide for La Monnaie in Brussels, Belgium. In 2001, Childs choreographed Los Angeles' Opera's Production of Wagner's Lohengrin, conducted by Kent Nagano. In 2002, Childs directed Orfeo ed Euridice for the Scottish Opera. In 2003, Childs choreographed Ravel's Daphnis et Chloé for the Geneva Opera Ballet. Childs choreographed John Adams' opera Doctor Atomic with the San Francisco Ballet in 2007. She also choreographed and directed Vivaldi's opera Farnace for the Opera du Rhin in 2012. Her most recent work, THE DAY, premiered in the Jacob's Pillow Dance Festival on August 1, 2019.

In 2009, Childs received the Lifetime Achievement Bessie Award. She was also awarded by the French government, which designated her as among the highest rank of dancer performers. Besides her own productions, Childs has also choreographed for the Paris Opéra Ballet, Lyon Opera Ballet, Pacific Northwest Ballet, and the Berlin Opera Ballet.

In 2015 she played a major part in Robert Wilson's and Arvo Pärt's Adam's Passion.

At the 2017 Venice Dance Biennial, she was awarded the Golden Lion for her lifetime achievements.

As of 2018, The Lucinda Dance Company has been shut down. When interviewed about the closing of her company, Childs states that "it's almost a natural thing. Everybody's ready to move on". While this is not the first time her company has closed, this does appear to be the last.

Childs's work was included in the 2021 exhibition Women in Abstraction at the Centre Pompidou.

== Style ==
"As one of America's leading modern dance choreographers, she makes work which can often be described as conceptual dance." While her minimalist movements were simple, the beauty in her choreography lay in her spatial exploration. Her work captivates the splendor of the different patterns the human body can create across a stage by basic repeated movements such as skipping or turning. She would create an entire performance piece based on one simple combination that would be repeated numerous times but in a different way. Whether she takes apart and reorders the combination or simply reverses it the same movements would not be repeated as they were initially introduced. Often, pieces she choreographed, such as Street Dance (1964), were accompanied by a monologue that would explain not only her movements but what it's about.

In a 2018 interview conducted by Rachel F. Elson of Dance Magazine, Childs states that she is "responding to the music" when she choreographs. She will listen to the music then think about all the different sequences, trying to figure out "where there could be musical transitions that we abide by, and where there are ones we don't abide by". Childs also mentioned, in Speaking of Dance: Twelve Contemporary Choreographers on Their Craft (2004), that the works of Jackson Pollock, Barnett Newman, Mark Rothko, Jasper Johns, and Robert Rauschenberg influenced her works. When she began her Company in 1973, Childs was interested in "creating dances with simple, geometrical spatial patterns". As such, her exploration of this topic lead to Childs creating a diagrammatical score that noted each dancer's path.

=== Street Dance ===
In Street Dance (1964), Childs created her stage on a street in Manhattan where her audience was the occupants of a nearby loft. The six-minute dance was based on its surroundings and the performers blended in with what was occurring on the street. Every so often they would point out different details about the appearance of the buildings and the assorted window displays. Although the audience was not completely able to see what exactly the performers were pointing to, they could hear the explanation from a nearby audio tape. Childs discusses the performance stating that "the result was that the spectator was called upon to envision information that existed beyond the range of actual perception...". Childs approached this piece from all different angles exploring dialect, architecture, and staging. The piece asked its viewers to look beyond what was in front of them and instead use different senses to visualize the unseen. This dance has only been performed three times, the most recent being the 2013 Philadelphia revival. In the revival, the dancers used stop-watches for timing purposes.

=== Einstein on the Beach ===
This was the first piece Childs had performed on a traditional stage in collaboration with Philip Glass and Robert Wilson. Up until this, her other works had all been performed in 'alternative spaces' such as churches, museums, galleries, and sidewalks. This was also the first piece that Childs had worked with a composer on. Einstein on the Beach (1976) was a five-hour-long production, normally beginning at six-thirty in the evening and finishing around eleven-thirty, and did not tell a story. The story was meant to be up to the audience to decide and that became an essential part of the piece itself. Childs' solo in Act I Scene 1 was structurally linked to the three visual and musical motifs of the opera. Childs also embodied many different characters within this solo through her gestures. The choreography for this piece came about through structured improvisation guided by Robert Wilson. Einstein on the Beach (1976) was a transition for Childs and a springboard into her most well-known piece, Dance (1979).

=== Dance ===
In her collaboration with Philip Glass and Sol LeWitt, Dance (1979), the minimalist quality of her choreography is evident. In this hour-long piece, the dancers move across the stage in pairs repeating the same balletic, geometric movements for 19 minutes and 55 seconds. Then the sequence shifts to a soloist who again, repeats the same combination of movements for 17 minutes. Each couple and soloist moves along the stage in a grid-like pattern. A projection of a filmed version of Dance (1979) allows the audience to view the piece from multiple angles at once, adding to the sense of a grid and geometric, abstract patterns.

Dance (1979) was composed of three ensemble sections containing eight dancer or four couples, then there were two soloist sections. Childs first took the composition Glass had made and analyzed how the music was constructed and designed her own structure of movement to interact with it. Childs choreographed this piece to come together with the music at points, and to counter it at others. The two structures were similar but not a true reflection.

Childs had the couples on stage during this piece as she feels the couples heighten the spatial relations between the dancers and the audience. Having two dancers on stage versus one opens up and charges the space with energy. The dancers were also accompanied by a film projected on the screen in front of the dancers. The dancers were visible from behind the screen, dancing in sync with the dancers in the film. The film aspect of this collaboration came from Sol LeWitt. In the original staging, the filmed dancers were the same as on stage. In the 2014 remount of Dance (1979), the dancers portrayed in the film are the original dancers, while the live performers have changed. LeWitt filmed the original dancers from various angles. Close-up shots, long shots, and overhead shots were used to create the abstract, almost ghost-like projection. The most frequent way to combine the dancers on stage to those in the film was a horizontal split-level, so the couples on stage were dancing along below the film. For the solo sections, a vertical split was used to show the front and back of the dancer at the same time. Childs describes the use of the projection as the dancers becoming the decor, the scenic element, instead of using a piece of abstract art which was the original suggestion before LeWitt came up with the idea to pair the dancers with a film.

=== THE DAY ===
Childs's latest work was composed in two parts, composed by David Lang and danced by Wendy Whelan. The cellist, Maya Beiser, sits on stage playing Lang's music while Whelan dances. The second part of THE DAY (2019), was "The World to Come." This section of THE DAY (2019) was about the idea of life after death as perceived by the Jewish religion. The piece was started around September 11, 2001, which later informed parts of the piece. Spoken word about the loss experienced at that time overlays the music. The messages were alphabetically arranged in the piece. The piece in its entirety is 30 minutes long with text coming in every six seconds.

Childs began choreography in the second part as it was more abstract. Each structure in the first part, with the text, took on a different meaning depending on the props used and Childs was able to drift the structures in and out of relating directly with the text or not. There were a lot of props in the first half, and it was all mainly performed through improvisation. While not set with specific movements, the first part of THE DAY (2019) was set in the way of prop movement. Childs and Whelan explored how to move each prop and let that be the focus of how the rest of the movements should flow, letting the material be similar but a little different every night. The focus of props in this piece goes back to Childs's first interest in creating movement by manipulating objects.

== Works ==
- 1963- Pastime
- 1963- Three Piece
- 1963- Minus Auditorium Equipment and Furnishings
- 1963- Egg Deal
- 1964- Cancellation Sample
- 1964- Carnation
- 1964- Street Dance
- 1964- Model
- 1965- Geranium
- 1965- Screen
- 1965- Museum Piece
- 1965- Agriculture
- 1966- Vehicle
- 1968- Untitled Trio
- 1973- Untitled Trio 2
- 1973- Particular Reel
- 1973- Checkered Drift
- 1973- Calico Mingling
- 1975- Reclining Rondo
- 1975- Congeries on Edges for 20 Oblique's
- 1976- Katema
- 1976- Radial Courses
- 1976- Transverse Exchanges
- 1976- Cross Words
- 1976- Figure Eights
- 1976- Einstein on the Beach
- 1977- Melody Excerpt
- 1977- Plaza
- 1977- Interior Drama
- 1979- Dance 1-5
- 1981- Mad Rush
- 1981- Relative Calm
- 1982- Formal Abandon Part 1
- 1982- Formal Abandon Part 2
- 1983- Available Light
- 1983- Formal Abandon Part 3
- 1984- Cascade
- 1984- Outline
- 1984- Field Dances
- 1986- Portraits in Reflection
- 1986- Clarion
- 1986- Hungarian Rock
- 1987- Calyx
- 1989- Mayday
- 1990- Perfect Stranger
- 1990- Four Elements
- 1991- Rhythm Plus
- 1992- Salome
- 1993- Concerto
- 1993- One and One
- 1993- Impromptu
- 1994- Chamber Symphony
- 1994- Trilogies
- 1995- Commencement
- 1995- Solstice
- 1995- From the White Edge Oh Phrygia
- 1995- Zaide (Director)
- 1996- Hammerklavier
- 1996- Don Carlos
- 2000- Chairman Dances
- 2007- Symphony of Psalms
- 2011- Océana
- 2013- Kilar
- 2015- Canto Ostinato
- 2016- Grosse Fugue by Ludwig van Beethoven, Opéra National de Lyon
- 2018- Petricor
- 2019- THE DAY
- 2020- Akhnaten, Opéra de Nice
- 2023- Lucinda Childs x 100
- 2026- Path 19
- 2027- Another Look
- 2028- Path of Miracles
