= Aileen Passloff =

American dancer and teacher (1931–2020)

Aileen Passloff (October 21, 1931 – November 3, 2020) was an American dancer and teacher who lived and worked in New York City. From 1949 to 1953, she studied at Bennington College. She attended the School of American Ballet, where she met James Waring, and participated in his workshops and dance company. From 1958 to 1968, Passloff ran the Aileen Passloff Dance Company in New York City. She was a member of the experimental dance collective Judson Dance Theater and part of their retrospective at the Museum of Modern Art. She was a professor of dance at Bard College for 40 years. Passloff stars in Marta Renzi's film Her Magnum Opus in 2018.

Passloff died at age 89 on November 3, 2020, of heart failure as a complication from lung cancer diagnosed in 2015.
