= Lumberyard Contemporary Performing Arts =

Coordinates: 42.2164°N 73.8659°W

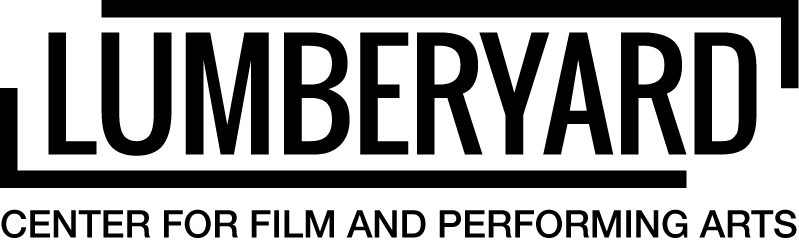
Lumberyard Center logo

== ADI/NYC ==
The New York City season is an evolution of ADI's production residency program, which provides significant support to artists as they integrate design elements into new work. Each of the five works in the 2016 ADI/NYC season has received up to two weeks of production support, including: unrestricted use of a theater and ADI's production crew; meals; housing and transportation, as needed; photo and video documentation; and a presenting fee. The program's goal is to provide artists with the resources they need to fully realize the vision for their new work.

== Performance Series ==
“Most of what Lumberyard presents in its performance series is work you might not otherwise see unless you trek to the niches of Lower Manhattan,” The Washington Post. This statement encapsulates the intention behind ADI's Performance Series. ADI purposely seeks out high-quality experimental dance by artists who may not be as well known to DC-area audiences as more conventional groups. Executive Director Adrienne Willis intentionally chose this type of programming because she firmly believed DC's intellectual audiences would respond positively to edgy, progressive dance. ADI's Performance Series runs from October through May each year, bringing to the DC area a diverse set of artists from across the U.S. and beyond. Current and past Performance Series companies by season include:

== Incubator ==
ADI's Incubator program, begun the same year as its Performance Series, is a late-stage residency program providing artists from outside the Washington, DC region with unrestricted use of ADI’s theater; unlimited support from ADI’s full-time production staff; housing; meals; local transportation; and a fee to help companies cover other expenses, such as dancer salaries . The program grew from a need within the dance community for late-stage dance residencies – residencies that enable artists to refine new works just before their premieres. Not only does the National Incubator provide area residents with a sneak peek at new works before anyone in the country, but ADI's National Incubator blog also provides insights from the artists about their artistic processes and more.

== Future Artists Scholarship ==
Beginning in 2016, ADI will offer scholarships that support the development of the next generation of artists and address issues of diversity and equitable access to dance training. ADI Future Artists Project is scholarship initiative investing in talented young dancers from diverse backgrounds to increase racial diversity in the dance field. ADI will build a flexible scholarship program that offers targeted scholarships to deal with a broad set of needs, including tuition, transportation stipends, and dance clothing. The project will target racially diverse students from all over the country that want to pursue professional training in dance.

== Audience Education/Opportunities ==
Prior to every Performance Series, National Incubator, ADI holds pre-show talks to provide insight into what audiences will see onstage – a unique component that has proven very successful. ADI also offers post-show receptions where patrons can interact with dance artists and each other. Catering to dance students age 16 and up, visiting artists often lead one-hour master dance classes to give DC-area dancers opportunities to learn from some of the most innovative choreographers working today.
