= Power Boothe =

American painter

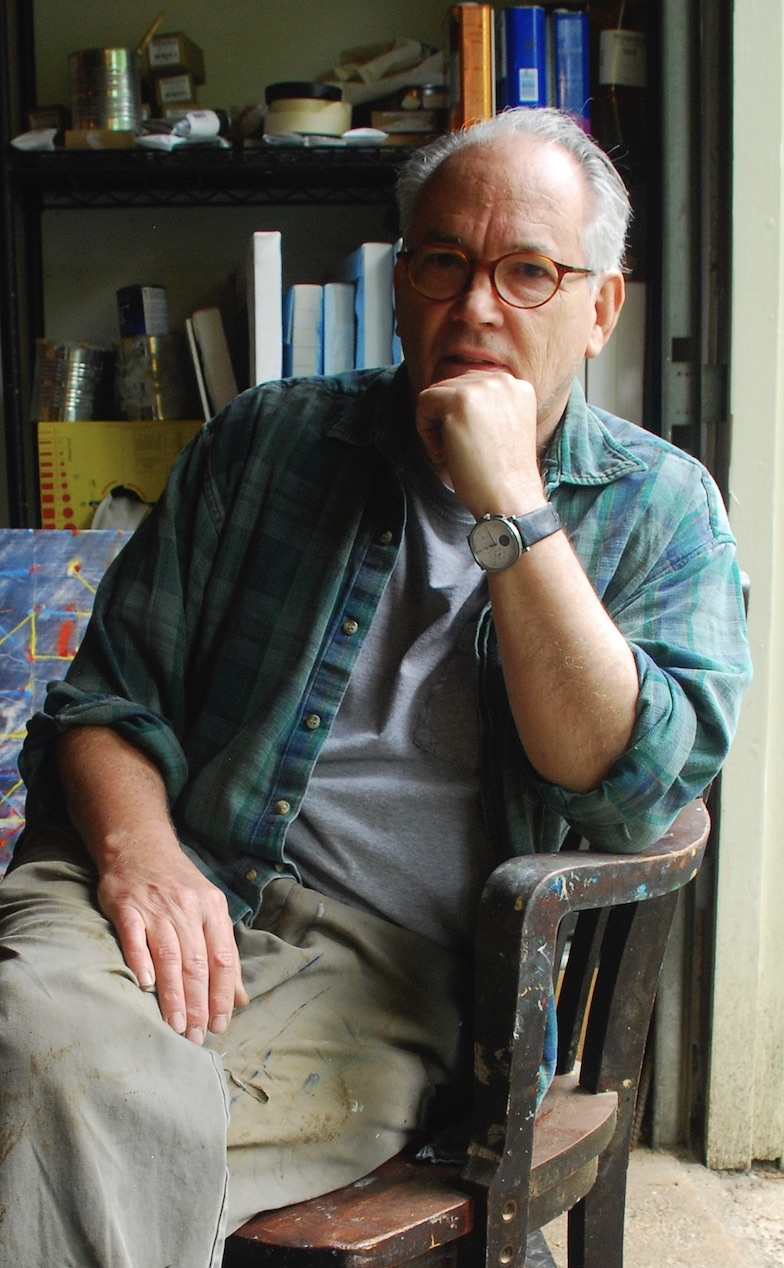
Power Boothe in studio, 2014.

Power Boothe is an American painter known for his abstract works as well as set designs for experimental theatre, dance and video productions. He has also produced short films and visual theater. As a painter, he has been referred to as a "Rogue Minimalist".

== Life ==
Power Boothe has exhibited his paintings for over four decades. His work is represented in public collections including the Metropolitan Museum of Art, the Guggenheim Museum, the Whitney Museum, and the Museum of Modern Art in New York. His work is also represented in the collections of the Wadsworth Atheneum in Hartford, the Baltimore Museum of Art, and the British Museum in the UK, as well as many private collections nationally and internationally.

Boothe has received numerous individual grants, including a National Endowment for the Arts Fellowship, a Pollock/Krasner Foundation Fellowship, and a Guggenheim Fellowship for painting. He has received awards for his designs for experimental theater, dance, and video productions, including a Bessie Award for set design, a Film/Video Arts Foundation Award for film, and several Art Matters Grants for theater. He has been the co-recipient of numerous collaborative grants including several NEA Inter-Arts Grants and NY State Council Grants, as well as a Lila Wallace Reader’s Digest Grant. In addition, he has been awarded a Yaddo Artists Colony residency, a McDowell Colony residency, and an Asian Cultural Council Grant for travel and study in Japan. He is also a member of American Abstract Artists.

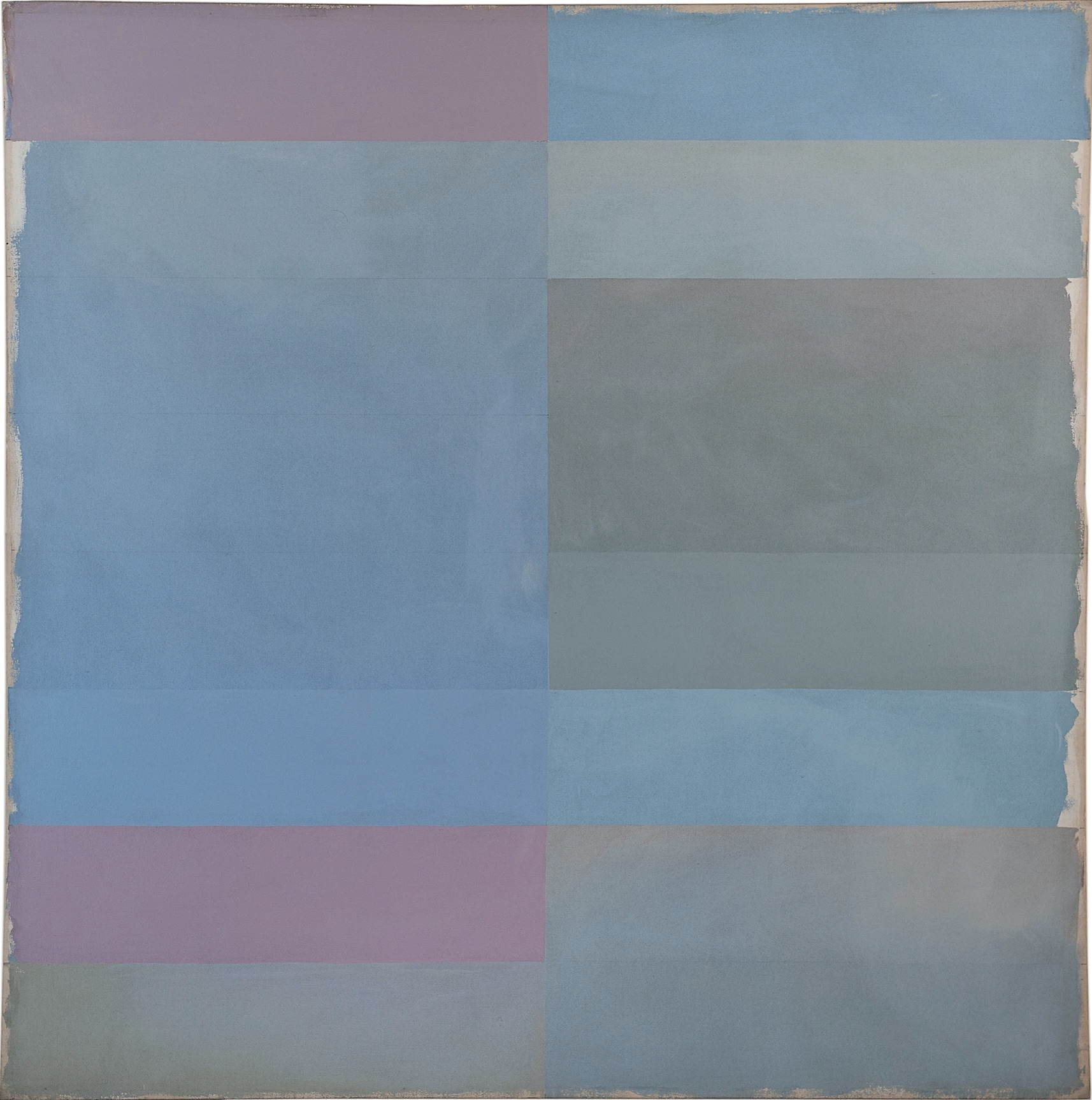
Power Boothe, Painting with Center Line, 1971, 72"x72", Acrylic on Canvas

Paintings, including Painting with Center Line, were exhibited in the 10th Theodoron Award Exhibition at the Guggenheim Museum in 1971. In his New York Times review of the exhibition, Hilton Kramer wrote, “The most interesting ‘discovery’ in the show is the painter Power Boothe, who works in a mode of color abstraction that is at once very cerebral and very romantic. His three paintings, as well as the attractive watercolor sketches, are full of attractive chromatic subtleties that seem- for a change!- to be derived from real emotions. I find his work enormously appealing.”

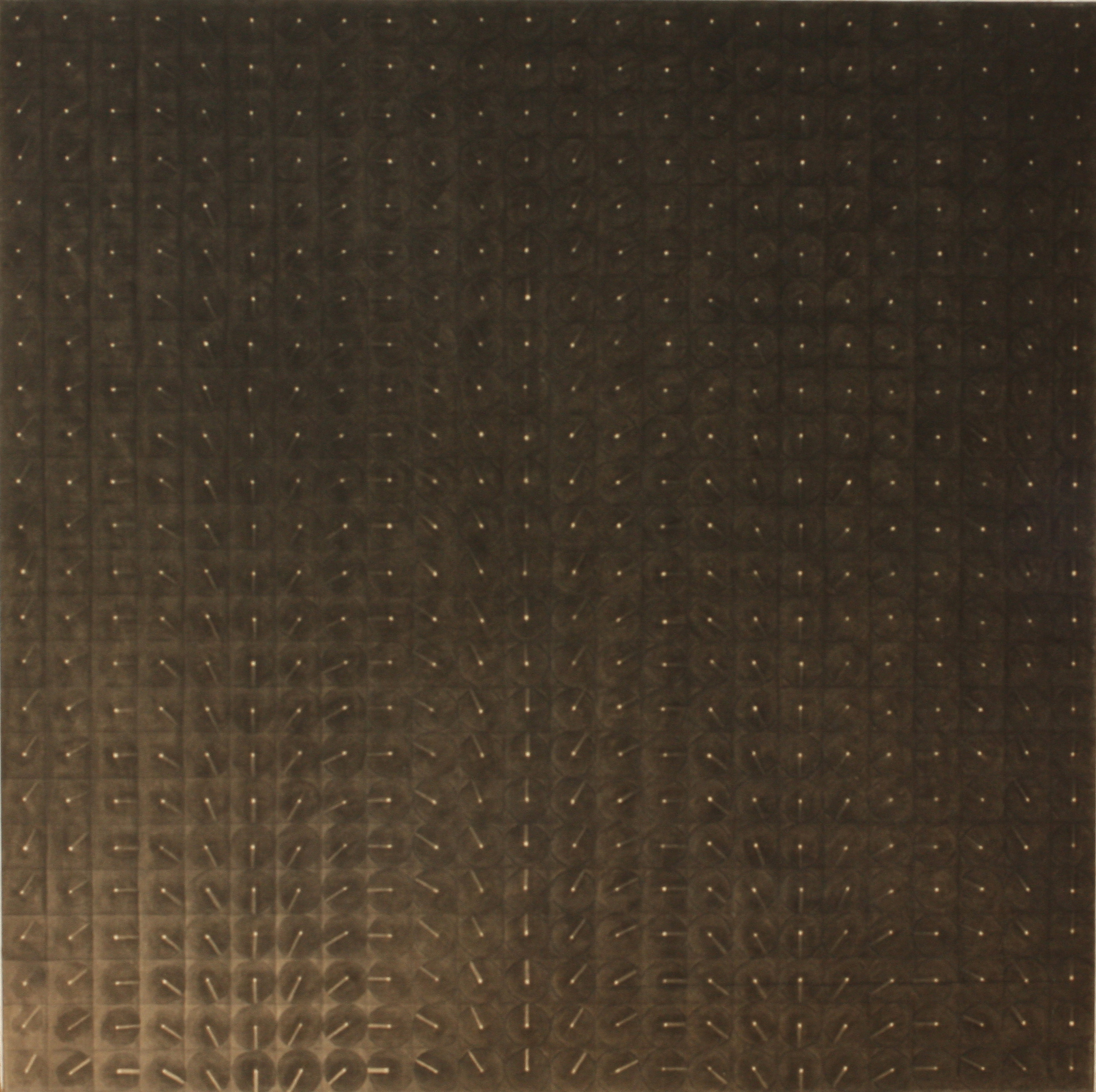
Power Boothe, Hours, 1973, 72"x72", Acrylic on Canvas

In 1973 Boothe's painting, Hours was exhibited in his first One-Person Exhibition at A. M. Sachs Gallery in 1973.

Boothe grew up in Lafayette, CA. He studied painting at the California College of the Arts and the San Francisco Art Institute, then received a BA in Painting from Colorado College, Colorado Springs, CO. He came to New York as a student in the Whitney Museum Independent Study Program in 1967, He continued to live and work as an artist for three decades in New York City. He studied classical archeology at the American School of Classical Studies in Athens, Greece, and linguistics and philosophy at the University of California, Berkeley. In 1989 he received an Honorary Doctorate of Arts degree from Colorado College for his mid-career accomplishments and a Ph.D. in Philosophy from the Institute for Doctoral Studies in the Visual Arts.

== Career ==
Boothe served as Lecturer in the Humanities at Princeton University from 1988 to 1994 and served on the faculty of the School of Visual Arts from 1979 to 1988. As Director of the School of Art at Ohio University from 1998 to 2001, he produced a symposium on cognitive theory and the arts: Art/Body/Mind. As Co-director of the Mount Royal Graduate School of Art at the Maryland Institute College of Art from 1993 to 1998, he curated the exhibition, Art + Necessity. The Maryland Institute awarded him the Trustees Award for Teaching Excellence in 1998. Boothe is currently a Professor of Painting at the Hartford Art School, University of Hartford. He served as Dean of the Hartford Art School from 2001 to 2010, where he led a successful campaign to build the Renée Samuels Center, a studio facility focused on teaching art and technology.

== Style ==
In 1981, Dore Ashton wrote an article in Arts Magazine in which she says:

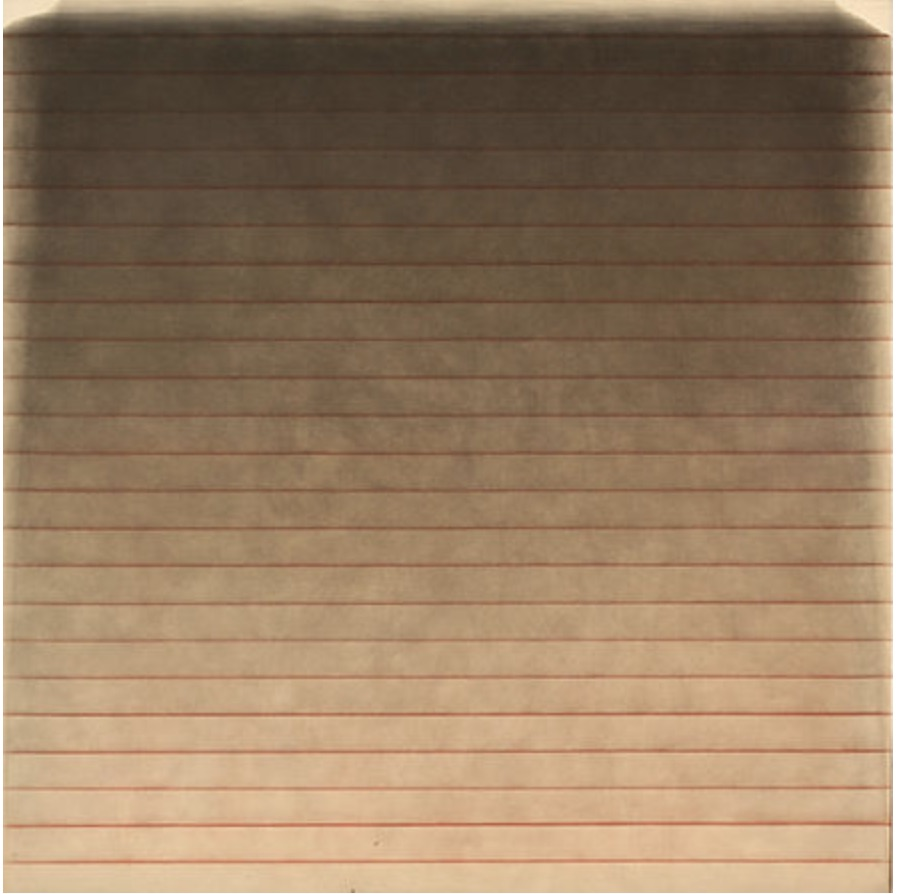
Power Boothe, Red Line Gray Drift, 1974, 72"x72", Acrylic on Canvas (Wadsworth Antheneum)

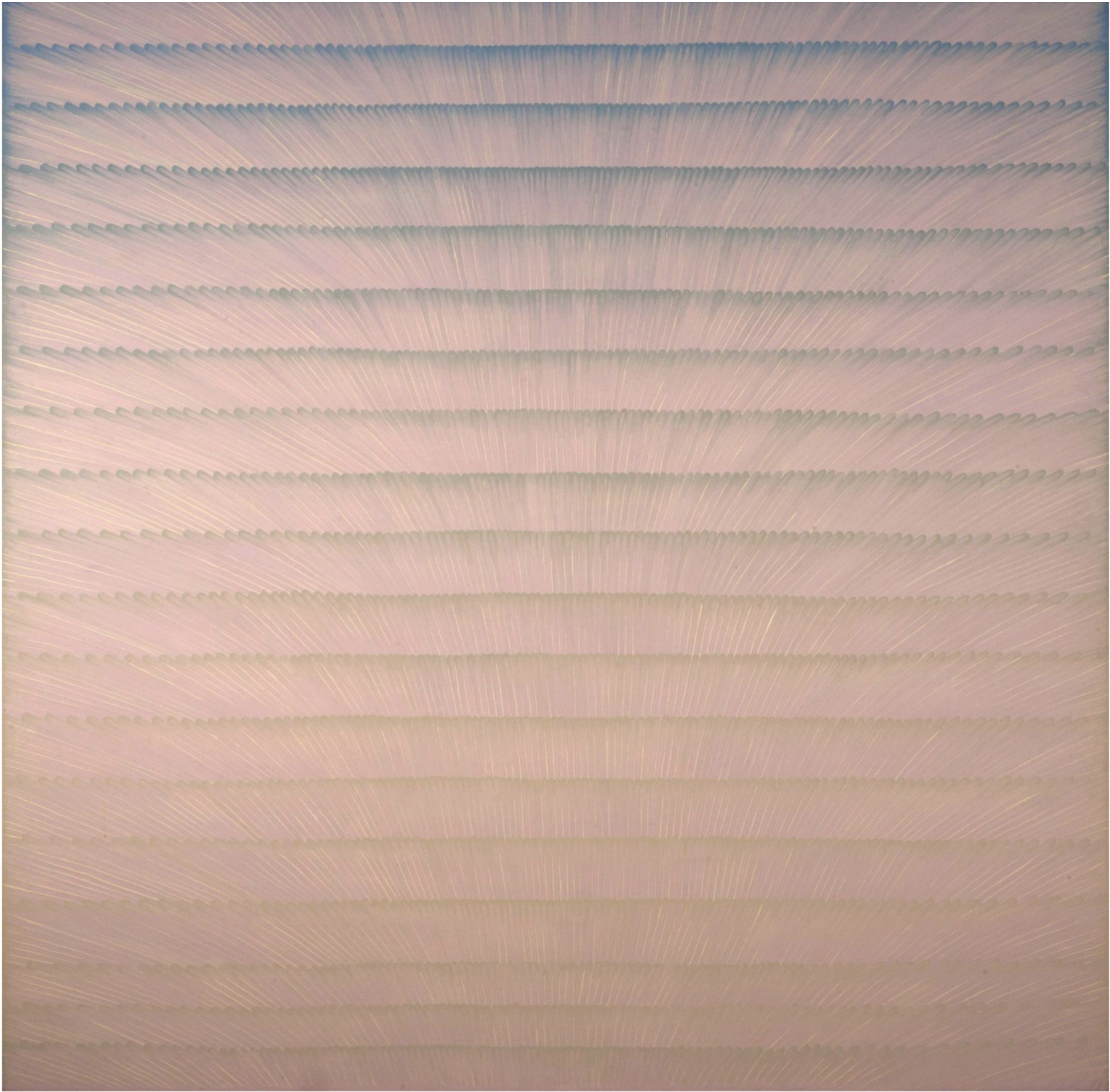
Power Boothe, Lapoetes Mavina, 1983, 72"x72", Oil on Canvas (New Britain Museum of American Art)

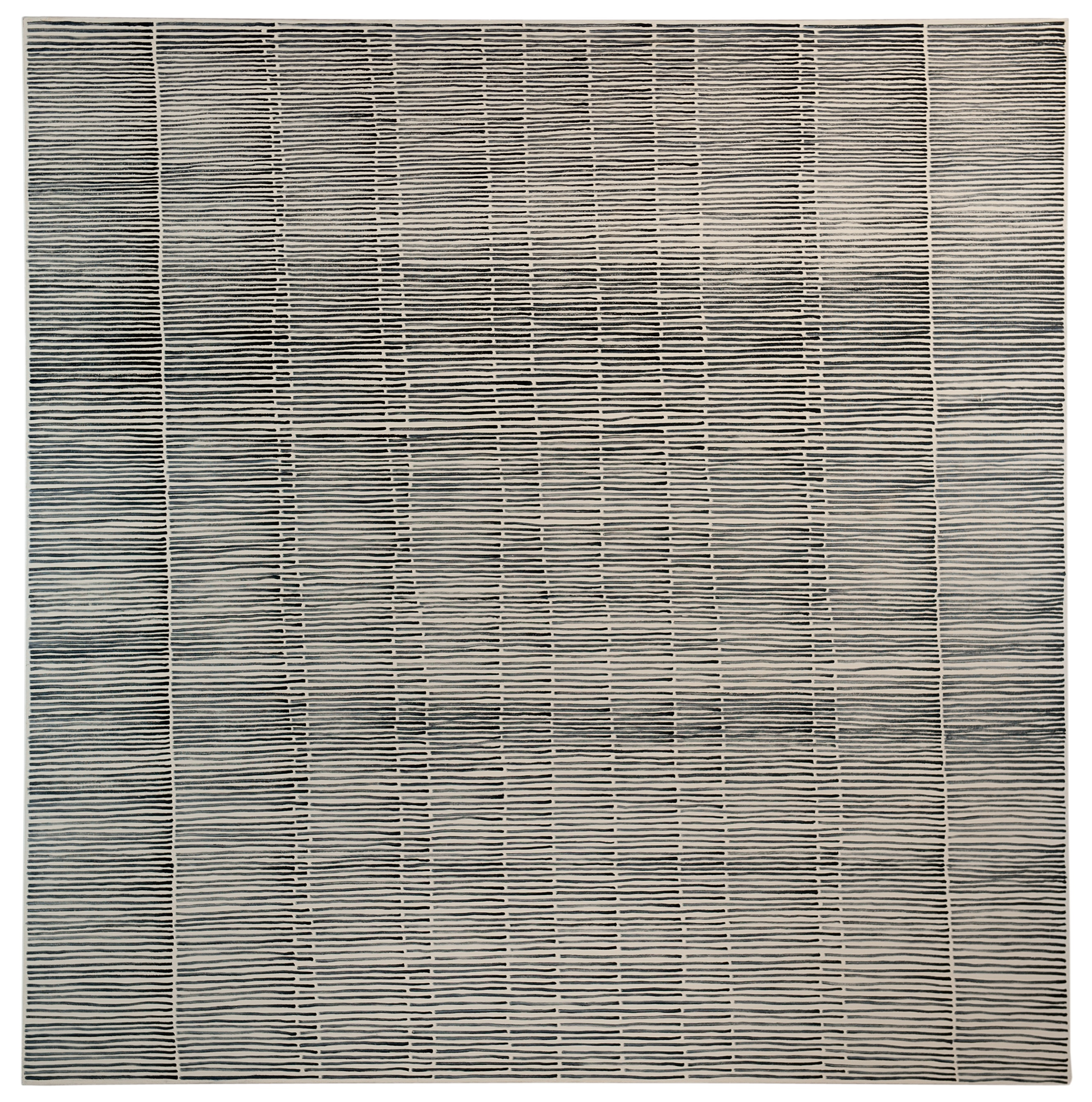
Power Boothe, Territory#1, 1994, 72"x72", Oil on Canvas

Measured, dreamlike, solemn, or quick and animated, there is always something insistently personal in the way Power Boothe treads. He is a painter for whom rhythm is the essential organizing force. Just as the symmetry of the human gait can be altered by countless fortuitous events (the most determined walker is distracted by sounds, movement, encounters), so the basic rhythmic structure of Boothe’s paintings is modified by countless emotional intonations. But essentially, these paintings are intimations of basic movements in the universe to which the artist is intuitively attuned.

Writing in 1988 in The New York Times on the occasion of solo shows in Greenwich and Stamford, Connecticut, art critic Vivien Raynor says of Boothe:

Mr. Boothe began as a figural artist, but before the end of his student days in the late 1960's, he had turned to abstraction, becoming what might be called a rogue Minimalist. That is, he works according to the grid but is not its slave. The roguery is already evident in the early works at the [Greenwich] show, which spans from 1971 to 1988. These are the canvases bisected into two columns of sizable rectangles painted in pastel hues. Some are hard-edged, others blurred. By 1973, the artist is hitting his stride, notably in two all black canvases. The grids in these are each filled with a motif - a disk with a white spot at the center and a white spot with a small comet's tail -but it is the square-to-square modifications of the motif that are the subject. Indeed, Mr. Boothe's whole subject seems to be the variations possible between one part of a painting and another, and between one painting and another. At the same time, it could also be the idea behind the aphorism, "the more things change, the more they are the same." [...] More than anything else, it is the variations in mood that keep Mr. Boothe apart from hard core Minimalists, along with his hints of automatism and of a fascination with puzzles."

Harold E. Porcher writes about Boothe:

[He] does not neatly fit into the file for Minimalist artists. In his oils, you see brush strokes, and in his drawings, varied pencil techniques that show his hand. But in the body of work as a whole, you see staccato rhythms and a consistency that draws you into the patterns while engaging your curiosity through the subtle variations. ... Boothe allows the viewer to identify with the creator of the work and not see it as a manufactured product void of life. In this way he shares the aesthetic of Minimalism, but also offers a connection to the painterly artists who followed other avenues.

Stephen Haller of ArtNews writes about Boothe's more recent work, saying:

“Boothe employs deceptively modest means in his work. Stare for a few moments at Territory #1, and the optical flutter created by his zippy monochromatic stripes produces a surprising rainbow of colors. The striated white lines that are limned on a wet black field in Extension reveal the artist’s deft touch and also imply that a natural force may have shaped the trajectory and flow. To say that Boothe has a remarkably steady hand understates the case. These paintings seem to have appeared full blown, with no evidence of correction.”

A New York Times review of a Boothe show in SoHo in 1995 said: "The syncopated patterns of Power Boothe's handsome abstractions, emblematic of a style that he has cultivated since the late 1960's, create intimations of the cinematic in the suggestion of a gentle, slow-motion light moving across a meticulously made surface that is still very much a painting."

== Performing arts ==
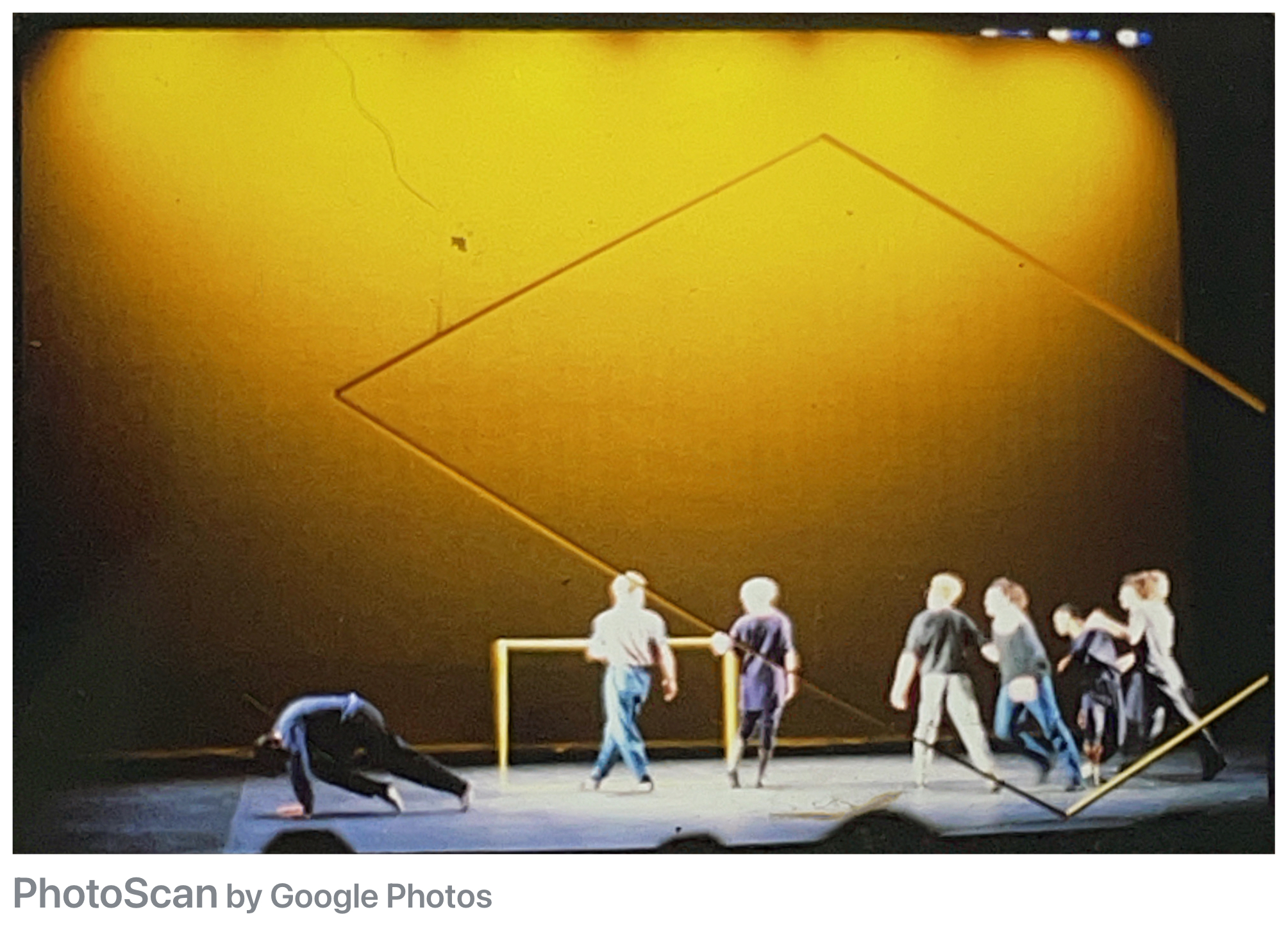
Power Boothe, set design for David Gordon Dance Production, Transparent Means for Travelling Light, 1985 (Harvard University)

In the performing arts, Boothe has designed sets for experimental theatre, dance and video productions. and has also produced short films and visual theater. For this work, he has received a Bessie Award for set design, a Film/Video Arts Foundation Award for film, and several Art Matters Grants for his theater productions. He has art directed and designed internationally-recognized music videos, and has designed sets for Obie Award-winning productions.
