= John Scott Dance =

Modern dance company based in Dublin, Ireland

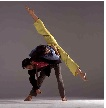
- Rough Air an IMDT Production
- Address: Rear 44 East Essex Street, Temple Bar; Dublin; Ireland
- Designation: Modern Dance Production Company

Construction
- Opened: 1991

Website
- irishmoderndancetheatre.com

John Scott Dance, formerly the Irish Modern Dance Theatre, is a Dublin based modern dance company. It was founded by John Scott in 1991 with the aim of creating, commissioning and expanding dance experience in Ireland.

== Background ==
The Irish Modern Dance Theatre (IMDT) was founded in 1991 by Dublin-born choreographer John Scott. In 1992 the company launched its first production, a piece called Beneath the Storm.

Many IMDT works have premiered in Dublin's Project Arts Centre, including Next to Skin. Next to Skin was described as an attempt to take dancers of different backgrounds and languages including Arabic, Persian, French, German and Kabaye, and produce a "stream of consciousness, describing what the other dancers are doing,".

Throughout the 90s IMDT had a number of shows that featured in the Dublin Theatre Festival such as Dance for Another Place in 1994, followed by Ruby Red in 1995, and You Must Tell the Bees in 1997. In the 2000s IMDT's continue to feature in festivals all over Ireland, making appearances in the International Dance Festival of Ireland in 2003 with Last Supper and 2006 with Close-Ups, and the Éigse Carlow Arts Festival in 2007 with Rhythmic Space, and the Kilkenny Arts Festival that same year with This Dancing Life.

This Dancing Life had a performance time of 4 hours, the aim being to have audience members leave the performance and come back later, with one reviewer saying "I've never walked out of a performance that I liked, but Sara Rudner's This Dancing Life is as much about not being there as being there. She doesn't really want audiences to sit through the four hours of dance".

In 2016, the company's name was changed to "John Scott Dance".

== International touring ==
As well as touring nationwide across Ireland IMDT is also extremely active in taking its work to international audiences with some notable appearances including The Ramallah Dance Festival in Palestine where the company performed its production of The White Piece, and Tanzmesse NRW, Düsseldorf, Germany. IMDT has also visited Sweden, France, Brazil, and Estonia.

== Films ==
IMDT has worked extensively with Steve Woods, a filmmaker based in the National Film School [Dún Laoghaire Institute of Art, Design and Technology]. In conjunction with Camel Productions IMDT has collaborated in the production three short dance films:

- Buaill (2006)
- Eternal (2008)
- Admit One (2010)

Buaill was set in the newly constructed Dublin City Council offices in Wood Quay, Dublin, while Eternal was filmed in Palestine using a mixture of local amateur dancers and Irish professionals. Admit One's setting was the Lighthouse Cinema in Dublin's Smithfield. All of these productions were done in conjunction with the [RTE] Dance on the Box programme. In November 2010 Admit One was selected to screen in the [Cork Film Festival].

== 2010–2016 ==
In 2010 IMDT took its production of Actions to New York's La MaMa Experimental Theatre Club, a show that includes music by Meredith Monk. IMDT's production Fall & Recover will visit La Mama ETC in March 2011, a venture that saw IMDT receive government support through Culture Ireland's initiative to promote Irish artistic work abroad. With Fall & Recover IMDT worked closely with The Irish Centre For Survivors of Torture and Rossa Ó Snodaigh, a member of the Irish folk band Kila, to produce a piece that examines the emotional effect that torture can have on people across the globe. Photographer Bryan O'Brien received awards for his photography of the show.

In November 2010 IMDT premiered In This Moment in the Project Arts Centre, a collaboration Charles Atlas, a video artist who has worked with Merce Cunningham and Antony and the Johnsons.

IMDT receives funding from Arts Council of Ireland, Dublin City Council and Culture Ireland.
