= ODC/Dance =

Contemporary dance and arts organization in San Francisco

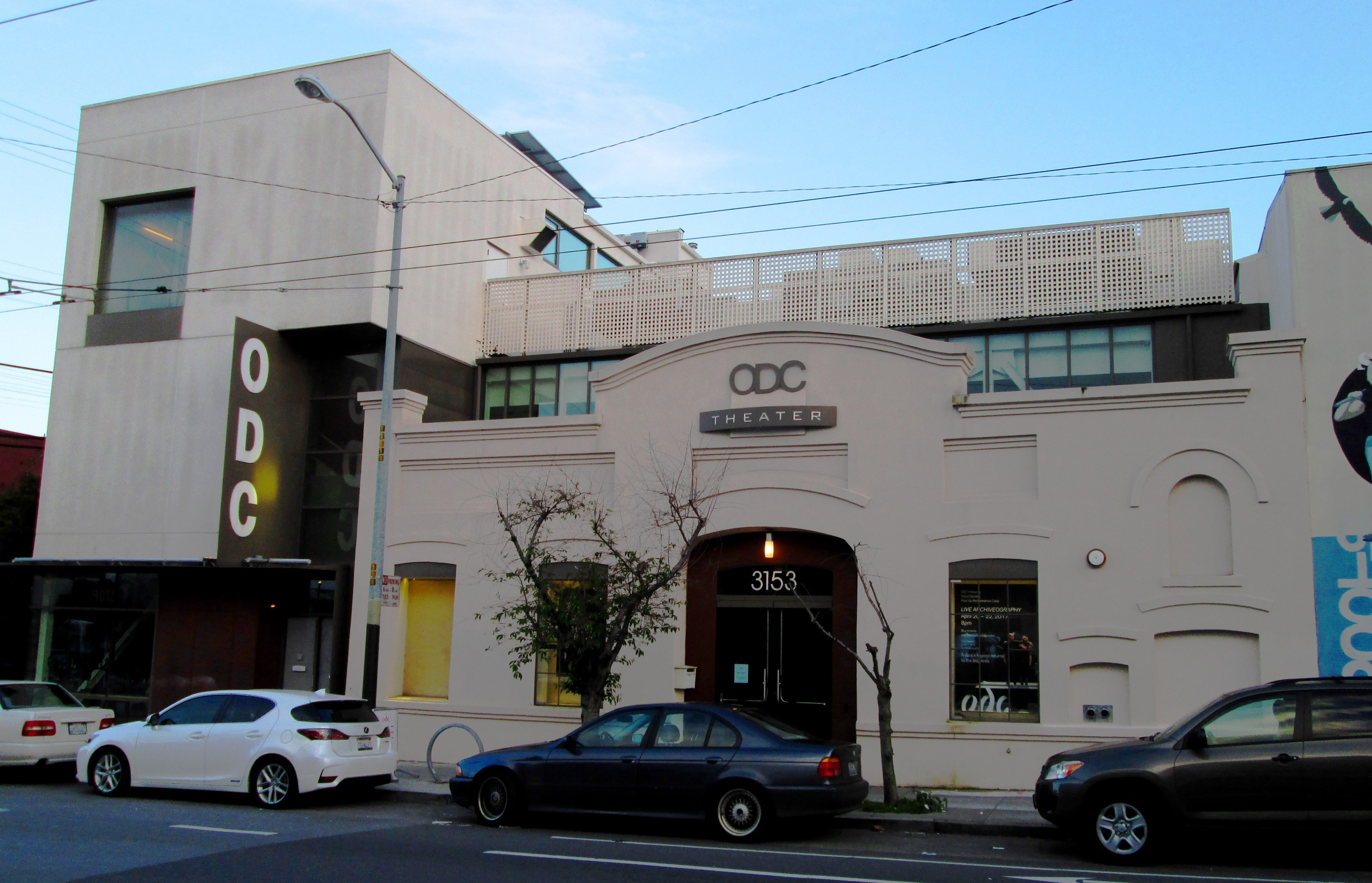
The ODC Theater at 3153 17th Street on the corner of Shotwell Street in the Mission District of San Francisco. The ODC Dance Commons is around the corner at 351 Shotwell Street.

ODC, formerly the Oberlin Dance Collective, is a contemporary dance and arts organization founded in 1971, in Oberlin, Ohio, by current artistic director Brenda Way. ODC relocated to San Francisco in 1976 and in 1979 became the first modern dance company in America to build its own facility, from which it still operates. ODC comprises ODC/Dance, its contemporary dance company, ODC Theater, and ODC School, which provides classes and training for youth, teen, and adult dancers.

ODC/Dance's programs involve 16,000 artists and students and reach 50,000 audience members annually. The company is noted for its fusion of classical and modern techniques and for its collaborations, including with writers Leslie Scalapino and Rinde Eckert; actors Bill Irwin, Geoff Hoyle and Robin Williams; and visual artists Wayne Thiebaud, John Woodall, and Eleanor Coppola.

== Name and move ==
The company was named after Oberlin College in Oberlin, Ohio, where Brenda Way was a member of the faculty. In the 1976 move, the company moved west in a yellow school bus.

== Repertory and awards ==
ODC/Dance Company has three resident choreographers, Brenda Way, KT Nelson, and Oberlin College's first dance major Kimi Okada. The company's repertory of over 120 works includes commissions for Alvin Ailey American Dance Theater, the San Francisco and Oakland Ballets, the Los Angeles and Santa Fe Operas, the Walker Art Center and the Festival des Etoiles, among others. Awards include five Isadora Duncan Dance Awards, a Guggenheim Fellowship (American Academy of Rome) residency for Way, and a Tony Award nomination for Okada. ODC was named "Best Dance Company" in the San Francisco Bay Guardian for 2005 and 2006 and the San Francisco Business Arts Council's choice for "Exceptional Non-Profit Arts Organization—2004".

Composed of eleven dancers, ODC/Dance performs its repertory for more than 50,000 people annually. ODC/Dance presents two home seasons at the Yerba Buena Center for the Arts, which feature new and repertory work, and the family production of The Velveteen Rabbit during the winter holiday season. ODC/Dance's touring roster has included the Kennedy Center, the Spoleto Festival, Jacob's Pillow, (BAM)and the Joyce Theater, as well as venues in Europe, Australia, Southeast Asia, and regions across the former Soviet Union.

== ODC School and Rhythm and Motion Dance Program ==
ODC School and Rhythm and Motion Dance Program offer a weekly schedule of over 200 classes for all ages and skill levels. In conjunction with ODC Theater, the School provides several mentoring programs for emerging and mid-career choreographers and was the first organization in San Francisco to offer a modern dance curriculum for children. ODC School offers tuition scholarships and educational outreach to San Francisco Bay Area youth. Its diverse array of classes include ballet, dances of the African diaspora, salsa, belly dance, hip hop, and tap, among other forms.

== ODC Theater ==
The ODC Theater is the site of over 150 performances a year involving nearly 1,000 local, regional, national and international artists. It sponsors curatorial, educational and mentoring opportunities, including a comprehensive three-year residency program that offers presentation, development and advocacy subsidies for emerging and mid-career artist in the San Francisco Bay Area.
