= Prince Music Theater =

Theater and opera company in Philadelphia

Film Society Center
- Interactive map of Film Society Center
- Former names: Karlton Theater, Midtown Theater, Prince Music Theater, Prince Theater
- Address: 1412 Chestnut Street, Philadelphia PA 19102, United States
- Location: Philadelphia, Pennsylvania
- Coordinates: 39.950878°N 75.164675°W
- Capacity: Mainstage: 443; Screening Room: 83
- Type: theatre, performing arts center, Opera house, Concert Hall, movie theater
- Events: Musical theatre, opera, Film, theatre, Dance, world music

Construction
- Opened: Theatre opened in 1921; American Music Theater Festival founded in 1984. Prince Theater opened in 1999

Website
- filmadelphia.org/phila-film-center/

The Prince Music Theater was a non-profit theatrical producing organization located in Philadelphia, Pennsylvania and specializing in music theatre, including opera, music drama, musical comedy and experimental forms. Founded in 1984 as the American Music Theater Festival by Marjorie Samoff, Eric Salzman and Ron Kaiserman, for the first 15 years AMTF performed in various venues throughout Philadelphia. In March 1999, AMTF moved into the renovated Midtown Theater and changed its name in honor of Broadway producer and director Harold Prince. AMTF/Prince Theater produced 92 world premieres and sent 81 productions to theaters in New York and worldwide.

== History ==
The American Music Theater Festival was founded in 1984 by Marjorie Samoff, Eric Salzman, and Ron Kaiserman. Salzman was the artistic director beginning with the first festival in 1984. The budget for the first year was $1.2 million, and six productions were shown. The venues for the first season were Walnut Street Theatre, Trocadero Theatre, Port of History Museum Theater, and Philadelphia College of Art. The venues for the second season in 1985 were the Annenberg Center for the Performing Arts, Walnut Street Theatre, and Mandell Theater at Drexel University.

The Prince Music Theater organization went bankrupt in 2010 and the building was subsequently sold at auction to a real estate group, which leased it to a successor organization also named the Prince Music Theater.

The 450-seat theater closed in November 2014. On March 5, 2015, the theater was bought by the Philadelphia Film Society, with the venue name changed to Prince Theater. The Film Society now operates the building as the Film Society Center, and completed renovations to the theater entrance and lobby in 2025.

== Notable productions ==
- Strike Up the Band revival (1984)
- A musical adaptation of The Emperor Jones starring Cleavon Little (1984)
- World premiere of X: The Life and Times of Malcolm X (1984, 1985)
- The Gospel at Colonus (1985)
- The Golden Land (1985)

The Prince Theater productions (primarily as the American Music Theater Festival) have included the world premieres of

- Julie Taymor, Elliot Goldenthal and Sidney Goldfarb's The Transposed Heads
- Duke Ellington's Queenie Pie
- Emily Mann, Ntozake Shange, and Baikida Carroll's Betsy Brown
- David Henry Hwang, Philip Glass and Jerome Sirlin's 1000 Airplanes on the Roof
- Frida, composed by Robert Xavier Rodriguez, libretto by Hillary Blecher and Migdalia Cruz
- Black Water by John Duffy and Joyce Carol Oates, based on her 1992 novel
- Adam Guettel and Tina Landau's Floyd Collins
- Philip Glass' Hydrogen Jukebox (concert version) - a staged version appeared later at the Spoleto Festival
- Harry Partch's Revelation in the Courthouse Park, staged by Jiri Zizka with choreography by George Faison
- Harold Prince's 3hree, a trilogy of one-acts with music by John Bucchino, Robert Lindsey Nassif and Laurence O'Keefe
- Chasing Nicolette by Peter Kellogg and David Friedman
- Albert Innaurato's Gemini, The Musical, with music by Charlie Gilbert
- The Green Violin

Revivals have included Love Life, St. Louis Woman, Pal Joey, Lady in the Dark, Adam Guettel's Myths and Hymns, Dreamgirls, Annie Get Your Gun, Hair, and Ain't Misbehavin'.
