= Postmodern dance =

Type of dance

Postmodern dance is a 20th century concert dance movement that came into popularity in the early 1960s. While the term postmodern took on a different meaning when used to describe dance, the dance form did take inspiration from the ideologies of the wider postmodern movement, which "sought to deflate what it saw as overly pretentious and ultimately self-serving modernist views of art and the artist" and was, more generally, a departure from modernist ideals. Lacking stylistic homogeny, postmodern dance was discerned mainly by its anti-modern dance sentiments rather than by its dance style. The dance form was a reaction to the compositional and presentational constraints of the preceding generation of modern dance, hailing the use of everyday movement as valid performance art and advocating for unconventional methods of dance composition.

Postmodern dance made the claim that all movement was dance expression and any person was a dancer regardless of training. In this, early postmodern dance was more closely aligned with the ideologies of modernism rather than the architectural, literary and design movements of postmodernism. However, the postmodern dance movement rapidly developed to embrace the ideas of postmodernism, which rely on chance, self-referentiality, irony, and fragmentation. Judson Dance Theater, the postmodernist collective active in New York in the 1960s, is credited as a pioneer of postmodern dance and its ideas.

The peak popularity of Postmodern dance as a performance art was relatively short, lasting from the early 1960s to the mid-1980s, but due to the changing definitions of postmodernism, it technically reaches the mid-1990s and beyond. The form's influence can be seen in various other dance forms, especially contemporary dance, and in postmodern choreographic processes that are utilized by choreographers in a wide range of dance works.

== Influences ==
Postmodern dance can be understood as a continuation in dance history: stemming from early modernist choreographers like Isadora Duncan, who rejected the rigidity of an academic approach to movement, and modernists like Martha Graham, whose emotion-filled choreography sought to exploit gravity, unlike the illusionistic floating of ballet.

Merce Cunningham, who studied under Graham, was one of the first choreographers to take major departures from the then-formalized modern dance in the 1950s. Among his innovations was the severance of the connection between music and dance, leaving the two to operate by their own logic. He also removed dance performance from the proscenium stage. To Cunningham, dance could be anything, but its foundation was in the human body— specifically beginning with walking. He also incorporated chance into his work, using methods like tossing dice or coins at random to determine movements in a phrase. These innovations would become essential to the ideas in postmodern dance, however, Cunningham's work remained grounded in the tradition of dance technique, which would later be eschewed by the postmodernist.

Other avant-garde artists who influenced the postmodernists include John Cage, Anna Halprin, Simone Forti, and other choreographers of the 1950s, as well as non-dance artistic movements such as Fluxus (a neo-dada group), Happenings, and Events.

== Characteristics ==
Major characteristics of postmodern dance of the 1960s and 1970s can be attributed to its goals of questioning the process behind and reasons for dance-making while simultaneously challenging the expectations of the audience. Many dancemakers employed improvisation, spontaneous determination, and chance to create their works, instead of rigid choreography. In order to demystify and draw attention away from technique-driven dance, pedestrian movement was also employed to include everyday and casual postures. In some cases, choreographers cast non-trained dancers. Furthermore, movement was no longer bound to the tempo created by accompanying music, but to actual time. One dance artist, Yvonne Rainer, did not inflect her phrasing, which had the effect of flattening the amount of time passing as dynamics no longer had a role to play between time and dance.

== Evolution ==
=== Early postmodern dance ===
The earliest usage of the term "postmodern" in dance was in the early 1960s. During the formative years of the performance art, the only defining characteristic was the participants' rejection of its predecessor, modern dance. The pioneer choreographers utilized unconventional methods, such as chance procedures and improvisation. Chance procedure, also known as dance by chance, is a method of choreography "based on the idea that there are no prescribed movement materials or orders for a series of actions." This means that the chance methods, which could be the toss of a coin, determine the movements rather than the choreographer. Dance by chance was not a distinctly postmodern method – it was first used by modern dancer and choreographer Merce Cunningham. Thus, despite their adamant rejection of their predecessors, many early postmodern choreographers embraced the techniques of modern and classical ballet.

=== Analytical postmodern dance ===
As postmodern dance progressed into the 1970s, a more identifiable, postmodern style emerged. Sally Banes uses the term "analytical postmodern" to describe the form during the 70s. It was more conceptual, abstract, and distanced itself from expressive elements such as music, lighting, costumes, and props. In this way, analytical postmodern dance aligned more with modernist criteria as defined by art critic Clement Greenberg. Analytical postmodern "became objective as it was distanced from personal expression through the use of scores, bodily attitudes that suggested work and other ordinary movements, verbal commentaries, and tasks." Modernist influence can also be seen in the analytical postmodern choreographers' use of minimalism, a method used in art that relies on "excessive simplicity and objective approach."

Analytical postmodern dance was also heavily influenced by the political activism taking place in the U.S. during the late 60s and early 70s. The Black Power movement, the anti-Vietnam war movement, the second-wave feminist movement, and the LGBTQ movement all became more explicitly explored in analytical postmodern dance. Many postmodern dancers during this time, despite their Euro-American backgrounds, were heavily influenced by African-American and Asian forms of dance, music and martial arts.

=== Postmodern dance 1980 and beyond ===
The 1980s saw a distancing from the analytical postmodern dance of the previous decade, and a return to expression in meaning, which was rejected by the postmodern dance of the '60s and '70s. Though stylistically, postmodern dance of the '80s and beyond lacked a unifying style, specific aspects could be seen throughout the work of various choreographers. The form took on an "alliance with the avant/pop music world" and saw increased distribution on international main stages, with performances in venues such as City Center and the Brooklyn Academy of Music, both in New York City. There was also an increased interesting in preserving dance on film, in repertory, etc., which contrasts the improvisational attitudes of early postmodern dance choreographers.

Another aspect that unifies the postmodern dance of 1980 forward is the interest in "narrative content and the traditions of dance history." The more recent forms of postmodern dance have distanced themselves from the formalism of the '70s and began a greater exploration into "meaning of all kinds, from virtuosic skill to language and gesture systems to narrative, autobiography, character, and political manifestos."

== Postmodern choreographic process ==
Postmodern dance utilized many unconventional methods during the choreographic process. One of the main methods used was chance, which is a technique pioneered in dance by Merce Cunningham that relied on the idea that there were "no prescribed movement materials or orders for a series of action." Choreographers would use random numbers and equations or even roll dice to determine "how to sequence choreographic phrases, how many dancers would perform at any given point, where they would stand on stage, and where they would enter and exit.” In using the chance technique, it was not uncommon for dancers in a postmodern piece to hear the music they were dancing to for the first time during the premiere performance.

Postmodern choreographers also often utilized an objectivism similar to literary theorist Roland Barthes' idea of "death of the author." Narratives were rarely conveyed in postmodern dance, with the choreographer more focused on "creating an objective presence." Performances were stripped down – dancers wore simple costumes, the music was minimalist or, in some cases, nonexistent, and performances often "[unfolded] in objective or clock-time rather than a theatrically-condensed or musically-abstract time." In this, postmodern choreography reflects the objective present, rather than the thoughts and ideas of the choreographer.

Although postmodern choreography may have seldom conveyed conventional narrative, postmodern artists of the 1960s and 1970s have also been known to make dances with implicit or explicit political themes. Yvonne Rainer has a history of politically conscious and active dance-making. For example, while still recovering from a major abdominal surgery, she performed her work Trio A and called it Convalescent Dance as part of a program of anti-Vietnam War works during Angry Arts Week in 1967. The works Steve Paxton created in the 1960s also were politically sensitive, exploring issues of censorship, war, and political corruption.
