= Doris Duke Artist Award =

Performing arts prize in the United States

The Doris Duke Artist Award is undertaken by the Doris Duke Charitable Foundation and designed to "empower, invest in and celebrate artists by offering multi-year, unrestricted funding as a response to financial and funding challenges both unique to the performing arts and to each grantee". Started in 2011, the program supports artists in jazz, theatre, and contemporary dance. The Doris Duke Artist Award now offers up to $575,000 of individual support ($550,000 in unrestricted funding and up to $25,000 to artists who have demonstrated that they are saving towards later years of their career). The prize was $275,000 until it was doubled 2023 in commemoration of the 10th Anniversary of the program and Doris Duke Foundation's continued commitment to supporting individual performing artists. Two classes of Doris Duke Impact Awards totaling $80,000 were made in 2014 and 2015, but the program was discontinued after that.

== Eligibility ==
Individuals are nominated for the award by nominators who are experts in the fields DDCF funds, as well as by previous Doris Duke Artists, and become eligible for the Award when they have won at least three designated national or regional grants, awards, or accolades. An anonymous panel reviews all eligible artists and recommends a class of recipients every year.

== Recipients ==
2012 Artist Award Recipients

- Anne Bogart, theatre
- Don Byron, jazz
- Wally Cardona, dance
- Rinde Eckert, theatre
- Bill Frisell, jazz
- Deborah Hay, dance
- John Hollenbeck, jazz
- Vijay Iyer, jazz
- Marc Bamuthi Joseph, theatre
- Elizabeth LeCompte, theatre
- Young Jean Lee, theatre
- Ralph Lemon, dance
- Richard Maxwell, theatre
- Sarah Michelson, dance
- Bebe Miller, dance
- Nicole Mitchell, jazz
- Meredith Monk, dance
- Eiko Otake, dance
- Takashi Koma Otake, dance
- Basil Twist, theatre
- Reggie Wilson, dance

2013 Artist Award Recipients

- Anthony Braxton
- Billy Childs
- Ping Chong
- Kelly Copper
- Lisa D'Amour
- DD Dorvillier
- Amir ElSaffar
- David Gordon
- Pat Graney
- Stacy Klein
- David Lang
- Pavol Liska
- Rudresh Mahanthappa
- John Malpede
- Miya Masaoka
- Myra Melford
- Tere O'Connor
- William Parker
- Elizabeth Streb
- Jawole Willa Jo Zollar

2014 Impact Award Recipients

- Muhal Richard Abrams
- Ambrose Akinmusire
- Steve Coleman
- Anna Halprin
- Trajal Harrell
- Julia Jarcho
- Jennifer Lacey
- Jodi Melnick
- Ben Monder
- Jennifer Monson
- Dean Moss
- Lucia Neare
- Aruán Ortiz
- Matana Roberts
- Tina Satter
- Jen Shyu
- Johnny Simons
- Michael Sommers
- Adrienne Truscott
- Cristal Chanelle Truscott

2014 Artist Award Recipients

- John Collins
- Joanna Haigood
- David Henry Hwang
- John Jasperse
- Emily Johnson
- Bill T. Jones
- Melanie Joseph
- Nancy Keystone
- Lisa Kron
- Oliver Lake
- Steve Lehman
- Tarell Alvin McCraney
- Roscoe Mitchell
- Zeena Parkins
- Annie-B Parson
- Ranee Ramaswamy
- Peggy Shaw
- Craig Taborn
- Randy Weston

2015 Artist Award Recipients

- Muhal Richard Abrams
- Ambrose Akinmusire
- Darcy James Argue
- Camille A. Brown
- Ronald K. Brown
- Ann Carlson
- Nora Chipaumire
- Steve Coleman
- Paul S. Flores
- Cynthia Hopkins
- Daniel Alexander Jones
- Alonzo King
- Okkyung Lee
- Linda Parris-Bailey
- Stephen Petronio
- Mildred Ruiz-Sapp
- Steven Sapp
- Shawn Sides
- Yosvany Terry
- Doug Varone

2015 Impact Award Recipients

- Becca Blackwell
- Kris Davis
- Lear deBessonet
- Mark Dresser
- Michelle Ellsworth
- Beth Gill
- Milford Graves
- Ishmael Houston-Jones
- Morgan Jenness
- Heather Kravas
- Dohee Lee
- Dianne McIntyre
- Matt Mitchell
- Carlos Murillo
- Brooke O'Harra
- Susan Rethorst
- Tyshawn Sorey
- Henry Threadgill
- Reggie Workman
- Pamela Z

2016 Artist Award Recipients

- Kyle Abraham
- Sharon Bridgforth
- Dave Douglas
- Faye Driscoll
- Janie Geiser
- Miguel Gutierrez
- Fred Hersch
- Wayne Horvitz
- Taylor Mac
- Dianne McIntyre
- Jason Moran
- Mark Morris
- Lynn Nottage
- Thaddeus Phillips
- Will Power
- Aparna Ramaswamy
- Matana Roberts
- Jen Shyu
- Wadada Leo Smith
- Morgan Thorson
- Henry Threadgill

2018 Artist Award Recipients

- Dee Dee Bridgewater
- Regina Carter
- Michelle Dorrance
- Stefon Harris
- Muriel Miguel
- Okwui Okpokwasili
- Rosalba Rolón

2019 Artist Award Recipients

- Donald Byrd
- Terri Lyne Carrington
- Michelle Ellsworth
- Marcus Gardley
- George E. Lewis
- Lauren Yee

2020 Artist Award Recipients

- Ana María Alvarez
- Andrew Cyrille
- Sean Dorsey
- Michael John Garcés
- Rennie Harris
- Dael Orlandersmith
- Cécile McLorin Salvant
- Pam Tanowitz

2021 Arts Award Recipients

- Lileana Blain-Cruz
- Teo Castellanos
- Kris Davis
- Dormeshia Sumbry-Edwards
- Cynthia Oliver
- Danilo Pérez
- Wayne Shorter

2023 Arts Award Recipients

- Chief Xian aTunde Adjuah
- Charlotte Brathwaite
- Ayodele Casel
- Somi Kakoma a.k.a. Somi
- Rosy Simas
- Kristina Wong

2024 Artist Award Recipients

- Nataki Garrett
- Shamel Pitts
- Acosia Red Elk
- esperanza spalding
- Chay Yew
- Miguel Zenón

2025 Artist Award Recipients

- Trajal Harrell
- Raja Feather Kelly
- Aya Ogawa
- Kassa Overall
- Kaneza Schaal
- Brandee Younger
