= Ishmael Houston-Jones =

American choreographer (born 1951)

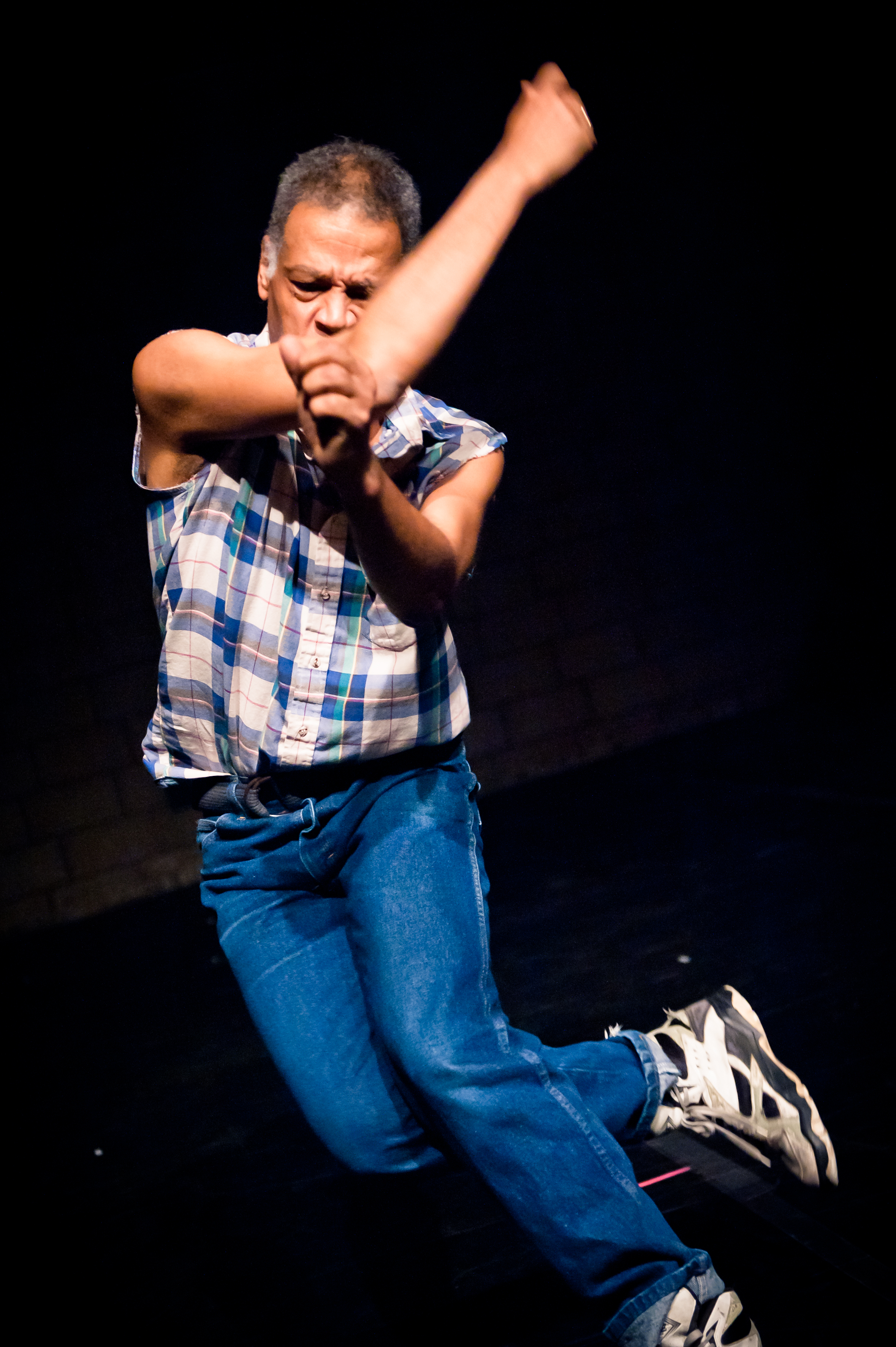
Ishmael Houston-Jones at American Realness 2011

Ishmael Houston-Jones (born 1951) is a choreographer, author, performer, teacher, curator, and arts advocate known for his improvisational dance and language work. His work has been performed in New York City, across the United States, in Europe, Canada, Australia and Latin America. Houston-Jones and Fred Holland shared a 1984 New York Dance and Performance Bessie Award for their work Cowboys, Dreams and Ladders performed at The Kitchen and he shared another Bessie Award in 2011 with writer Dennis Cooper and composer Chris Cochrane for the 2010 revival of their 1985 collaboration, THEM. THEM was performed at Performance Space 122 (PS 122), the American Realness Festival, Springdance in Utrecht, Tanz im August in Berlin, REDCAT in Los Angeles, Centre Pompidou in Paris, and at TAP, Theatre and Auditorium of Poitiers, France. The 1985 premier performance of THEM at PS122 was part of New York's first AIDS benefit.

== Life and career ==
=== Early years ===
Charles Houston Jones, born 1951 in Harrisburg, Pennsylvania, was the only child of North Jones and Pauline Jones, née Houston. He attended public primary and secondary school there and he attended his first dance class when he was 16 years old and a junior at William Penn High School. The Harrisburg Community Theater offered free dance classes to teenagers, and as he was involved in theater in school he went. This jazz-based show was his first experience performing dance. He enrolled as an English/Drama major at Gannon College, (now Gannon University) in Erie, Pennsylvania in 1969. There was no dance program and he only studied there for two years before he "accidentally" dropped out. He was traveling the summer after his sophomore year of college with the intention of returning to school in the fall, but he found himself in Israel, and decided to stay there for a year. He worked as a pig farmer for nine months at Kibbutz Lahav in the Negev Desert. Then he worked for three months on a banana plantation at Kibbutz Adamit in the Galilee on the border with Lebanon. Houston-Jones found 1971 to be a propitious time to be in Israel; it was the years between The Six-Day War and The Yom Kippur War and there was a calm atmosphere among the Israelis. He had always been fascinated by collective socialist living situations, so the idea of being on a kibbutz intrigued him. He had never done any kind of heavy farm work and while there he had to get up at 4 AM: feeding pigs, mating them and working in the slaughterhouse. When he moved north to Adamit he worked harvesting bananas, and at the end of most days, he and his comrades would go skinny-dipping in the Mediterranean. He would sometimes dance on the beach in the nude. Houston-Jones was able to take just one dance class that entire year; the African-American choreographer and dancer Gene Hill Sagan was teaching on a nearby kibbutz. It was around this time that he began to use Ishmael as his first name and hyphenated his parents' surnames, though he never legally changed either.

=== Philadelphia ===
After returning to the US in 1972 Houston-Jones moved to Philadelphia. He audited dance classes at Temple University with Helmut Gottschild and Eva Gholson. He then got into the Wigman-based company Group Motion Media Theater with whom he danced for two years. After leaving Group Motion he began studying improvisation and later performing with Terry Fox and the musician Jeff Cain under the name A Way of Improvising. He also studied with Joan Kerr, Les Ditson, Contact Improvisation with John Gamble and "African" at Ile Ife, the Arthur Hall Afro American Dance Ensemble . It was during this time that he formed a strong comradeship with the visual artist Fred Holland who he met through their mutual involvement with the Painted Bride Art Center. Houston-Jones and Fox were Holland's first dance teachers. Holland went on to make his own award-winning dance/theater works, some in collaboration with Houston-Jones. Houston-Jones began making his own work in 1976. That year, in collaboration with fellow ex-Group Motion dancer Michael Biello & musician Dan Martin, he formed the gay-men's performance collective Two Men Dancing. This group made four evening-length works, most notably What We're Made Of in 1980. This piece was begun during his last year in Philadelphia; after living there for seven years, he moved to New York on Thanksgiving Day, 1979.

=== New York ===
Houston-Jones arrived in New York's East Village in early 1980. He did some Contact Improvisation performances at Danspace Project with Danny Lepkoff, with whom he had studied. The East Village community at that time was infused with punk, new wave, drag, drugs and the mixing of a hipper, younger gay population with the modern dance and experimental theater milieux. Houston-Jones, like many dancers at the time, was influenced by the gay/punk/club scene and also by break dancing, graffiti and rap music. The first time Houston-Jones heard future collaborator Chris Cochrane play was at the club 8 BC. Dancers and choreographers would go to 8 BC, Limbo Lounge, the Pyramid Club, or King Tut's Wah-Wah Hut to see shows and also to perform. There was a palpable excitement and eagerness to see what was happening at venues such as PS 122, The Kitchen, Dance Theater Workshop and Danspace Project at Saint Mark's Church. There were smaller, grittier spaces as well like Dixon Place and Chandelier where something new was happening almost every night. With the exception of the Wah-Wah Hut and Chandelier, Houston Jones performed at all of these venues. It was during this time that Houston-Jones first heard Dennis Cooper read from his book The Tenderness of the Wolves, and knew that he wanted to work with him. At around this time, the pall of AIDS began to hover over the dance world. People in the dance and performance art communities were becoming sick and dying. Dance contemporaries of Houston-Jones (John Bernd, Arnie Zane, Harry Sheppard, et al.) died at this time. Houston-Jones volunteered with the organization God's Love We Deliver, and brought meals to people who were left homebound by the disease.

Also during the early 1980s Houston-Jones traveled twice to Nicaragua. He was there while the Sandinista government was at war with the US-funded Contras. For two weeks in 1983 he was part of a North American delegation at a theater festival and as a guest of the state. He was chauffeured in buses, housed in a hotel, fed in restaurants and generally pampered. The following year, 1984, he returned on his own, staying in a family's rented room and getting around on his own, which he found extremely difficult. He had met some people on his first trip who had arranged for him to teach at the University of Central America, Managua. He taught contact improvisation to Sandinista soldiers. Students would show up in their fatigues, wearing leotards underneath. They would change and prop their rifles against the wall. He was in Nicaragua only over a month but after this second visit he became much more engaged with progressive politics and social issues. It was from these experiences, plus losses due to AIDS, and Reaganomics that his work began to shift and pieces like f/i/s/s/i/o/n/i/n/g, Radio Managua and THEM were created. He also made several collaborative pieces, some with Fred Holland and later with the writer Dennis Cooper. He collaborated with several musician/composers who came from the punk and club scenes, most notably, Chris Cochrane from the bands No Safety and Suck Pretty. During this time he was funded by the National Endowment for the Arts, the New York Foundation for the Arts and other agencies and he traveled several times to Europe and Venezuela to perform and to teach.

== Professional work ==
Other significant choreography by Ishmael Houston-Jones includes: 13 Love Songs: dot dot dot, Houston-Jones' collaboration with Emily Wexler which premiered at American Realness in 2014. No Where /Now Here was commissioned for Mordine and Company in Chicago in spring 2001 and Specimens was commissioned for Headlong Dance Theater in Philadelphia in 1998. In 1997 Houston-Jones was the choreographer for Nayland Blake's Hare Follies at the Brooklyn Academy of Music. From 1995 to 2000 Houston-Jones was part of the improvisational trio Unsafe / Unsuited with Keith Hennessy and Patrick Scully . In 1990 he and Dennis Cooper presented The Undead at the Los Angeles Festival of the Arts. In 1989 Houston-Jones collaborated with filmmaker Julie Dash on the video Relatives, which featured a performance by his mother, Pauline H. Jones and was aired nationally on the PBS series Alive From Off-Center (Alive TV). Houston-Jones has collaborated with composers King Britt, Chris Cochrane, Fast Forward, Dave Pavkovik, Chris Peck, Tom Recchion, Leslie Ross and Guy Yarden. He was also a longtime collaborator of Blondell Cummings.

In addition to his own choreography, Houston-Jones has performed in the work of John Bernd, Ping Chong, Dancenoise, Terry Fox, Beth Gill, Miguel Gutierrez (choreographer), Lionel Popkin, Mike Taylor, and Yvonne Meier. He has a small role, (Dancer) in the John Sayles 1984 film The Brother from Another Planet. and he appears in Caspar Strache's 1998 film Circle's Short Circuit and The Situation Room, 2004, directed by Steve Staso.

=== Recent ===
In the early 2000s Houston-Jones made a deliberate decision to stop making dance pieces. He felt that he didn't know what he wanted to say and that he didn't want to just make work just for the sake of making work. He was committed to performing in other people's pieces (Yvonne Meier, Lionel Popkin, and others), but he didn't feel he had anything new to offer of his own. He did, during this time, make pieces with students at Alfred University, the New School, and at the American Dance Festival. He concentrated on teaching, writing, and serving on the boards of several not-for-profit dance organizations: (Headlong Dance Theater, Danspace Project, Movement Research, and Ashley Anderson Dances .)

Then in 2009, after not making professional dance pieces for eight years, Houston-Jones made The Myth and Trials of Calamity Jane and the Son of the Queen of the Amazons in collaboration with Ashley Anderson and This Ring of Fire in collaboration with Daniel Safer both at Dance New Amsterdam, (DNA). Also in 2009 he was asked to revive three of his works from the 1980s: What We're Made Of (1980), DEAD (1981), and THEM (1986). All three revivals were completed and performed in 2010. The re-imagined THEM has since toured to four cities in Europe and to Los Angeles. His most recent piece, 13 Love Songs: dot dot dot, a collaboration with Emily Wexler premiered in January 2014 at the American Realness Festival in New York and toured to the American Dance Festival in North Carolina.

== Publications ==
As an author Ishmael Houston-Jones' essays, fiction, interviews, and performance texts have been anthologized in the books:

• Dance, Documents of Contemporary Art, (White Chapel gallery, 2012); • Conversations on Art and Performance, (Johns Hopkins, 1999); • Footnotes: Six Choreographers Inscribe the Page, (G+B Arts, 1998); • Caught in the Act: A Look at Contemporary Multi-Media Performance, (Aperture, 1996); • Aroused, A Collection of Erotic Writing, (Thunder's Mouth Press, 2001); • Best Gay Erotica 2000, (Cleis Press, 2000); • Best American Gay Fiction, volume 2, (Little Brown, 1997); • and Out of Character: Rants, Raves and Monologues from Today's Top Performance Artists, (Bantam, 1996). • His articles have also been published in the magazines: Bomb (magazine), PAJ (journal)), Movement Research Performance Journal; Contact Quarterly; Real Time; Mirage, FARM; and others.

He is a subject of the chapter "Speech as Act" in the book Dances that Describe Themselves by Susan Leigh Foster (Wesleyan University Press, 2002). and the chapter "Crossing the Great Divides" in the book Taken by Surprise by Ann Cooper Albright and David Gere, (Wesleyan University Press, 2003).

== Curating ==
Ishmael Houston-Jones' work as a curator includes being the chief curator for PLATFORM 2012: Parallels at Danspace Project in New York, which marked the 30th anniversary of the original Parallels series he curated at Danspace in 1982. PLATFORM 2012: Parallels was a two-month-long survey that looked at the intersection of African-American choreographers and post modern dance. Houston-Jones curated eight weeks of performances, panel discussions, video screenings and special events that included a diverse range of African, Caribbean and African-American experimental dance artists. Some participating artists both in 1982 and 2012 were Bondell Cummings, Fred Holland, Ralph Lemon, Bebe Miller, and Jawole Willa Jo Zollar. In choosing those who may become the next generation of Black dance makers Houston-Jones curated works by Will Rawls, Kyle Abraham, Okwui Okpokwasili, Marjani Forté, Darrell Jones, Zimbabwe-born Nora Chipaumire, and approximately 30 other artists. PLATFORM 2012: Parallels also included evenings curated by Ralph Lemon, Bebe Miller, Will Rawls, Jawole Willa Jo Zollar, and Dean Moss. Film clips of the original 1982 Parallels Series as well as of an historic 1983 debate between choreographers Bill T. Jones and Steve Paxton verbally sparring over the place of Blacks within the "postmoderns." The Platform concluded with a 12-hour marathon curated by Ralph Lemon in which 12 artists of color interacted (one each hour) with sculptures created for the event by the artist Nari Ward .

In 1999 Houston-Jones, along with Yvonne Meier, curated a festival of New Swiss Dance, at the Swiss Institute New York. Ishmael Houston-Jones is also the current curator for the DraftWork series for works-in-progress at Danspace Project.

== Teaching ==
Ishmael Houston-Jones has been a guest or adjunct professor at:

• Eugene Lang College The New School for Liberal Arts; • New York University, (Tisch School of the Arts, the Experimental Theater Wing and Playwrights Horizons), • University of the Arts (Philadelphia), • Sarah Lawrence College, • Hollins University, (Virginia), • Hollins University / American Dance Festival MFA Program • Bennington College, (Vermont), • the School of the Art Institute of Chicago, • University of Memphis, • Wesleyan University, (Connecticut), • University of California, Los Angeles, UCLA, and • the California Institute of the Arts.

Houston-Jones has also been on the faculty of:

• the American Dance Festival at Duke University, • Movement Research, (New York), • the European Dance Development Center and the School for New Dance Development in Holland, • Urban Bush Women Summer Institute at Florida State University • the Seattle Festival of Alternative Dance and Improvisation, (SFADI), • La Escuela de Danza Nacional in Managua, Nicaragua, • El Instituto de la Danza Moderna in Caracas, Venezuela, • The Anti Static Festival, Sydney, Australia, and at • the London International Summer School 2002, (Greenwich Dance, Chisenhale Dance Space and Independent Dance).

== The Lambent Fellowship in the Arts ==
From 2002 to 2007 Ishmael Houston-Jones was the Coordinator for the Lambent Fellowship in the Arts of Tides Foundation. In this capacity he spearheaded and structured a program that awarded unrestricted, multi-year grants to individual visual and performing artists in metropolitan New York. For five years under Houston-Jones' guidance, fellowships of $21.000 were awarded to six artists annually.

A partial list of artists funded through this program overseen by Ishmael Houston-Jones includes: Sanford Biggers, Patty Chang, Miguel Gutierrez, Emily Jacir, John Jasperse, Noémie Lafrance, Julie Atlas Muz, Sekou Sundiata, Swoon (artist), Ricardo Miranda Zuñiga, Elana Herzog, Deborah Grant, Mary Ting, Nicolas Dumit Estevez, Clifford Owens, Bradley McCallum & Jacqueline Tarry, Yoko Inoue, Cathy Weis, Yvonne Meier, RoseAnne Spradlin, Ivan Monforte, Judi Werthein and Jennifer Monson.

== List of choreographic works ==
- 1974–76 A Way of Improvising; with Terry Fox, Jeff Cain
- 1976 Two Men Dancing (an improvisation on their maleness); collaboration with Michael Biello; music, Jeff Cain; sets Deryl Mackie
- 1978 Dances Round The Faggot Tree; collaboration with Michael Biello & Dan Martin (music) as Two Men Dancing
- 1979 Night/Light; collaboration with Michael Biello, Dan Martin as Two Men Dancing
- 1980 What We're Made Of; collaboration with Michael Biello, Dan Martin as Two Men Dancing
- 1981 DEAD; solo
- 1982 Part 2: Relatives; with Pauline H. Jones
- 1983 Untitled (sometimes called Oogala); collaboration with Fred Holland
- 1983 Babble: First impressions of the white man; collaboration with Fred Holland
- 1984 f/i/s/s/i/o/n/i/n/g; solo
- 1984 Cowboys, Dreams, and Ladders; collaboration with Fred Holland
- 1985 THEM; collaboration with Dennis Cooper, text & Chris Cochrane, music, and performers John B. Walker & Donald Fleming
- 1986 THEM; collaboration with Dennis Cooper and Chris Cochrane
- 1986 2 solos: Radio Managua and 3 folk dances; solos; music for 3 Folk Dances: Chris Cochrane
- 1986 Adolfo und Maria: "Duh Guvnuh's Dancin' Gal; music Doug Henderson & Guy Yarden; sets and costumes Huck Snyder
- 1987 Tell Me; collaboration with Yvonne Meier; song score, 3 TEENS KILL 4
- 1987 How to Pray for 21; collaboration with Fred Holland
- 1987 The Onyx Table; collaboration with Fred Holland
- 1988 Prologue to the End of Everything; music, Chris Cochrane with Doug Seidel and Zeena Parkins; sets, Robert Flynt, Impala
- 1988 Slow Motion Suicide; collaboration with Fast Forward
- 1989 Relatives; film: directed and produced by Julie Dash; with Pauline H. Jones
- 1989 HOLE; collaboration with Dennis Cooper
- 1989 Knife/Tape/Rope; collaboration with Dennis Cooper, John DeFazio & John B. Walker
- 1989 HOLE: (The spoken word); collaboration with Dennis Cooper
- 1990 The Undead; choreography and direction: Peter Brosius & Ishmael Houston-Jones; text: Dennis Cooper; design, Robert Flynt; music, Tom Recchion
- 1990 In the dark / Without hope; solos
- 1995–2000 Unsafe/Unsuited; collaboration with Keith Hennessy and Patrick Scully
- 1995 Rougher; collaboration with Steven Craig
- 1996 Eyes, mouth and all the rest : surrendering to the desire(s) of others; solo plus
- 1997 Hare Follies; conceived and directed by Nayland Blake; choreographed by Ishmael Houston-Jones
- 1998 Specimens; with D. Brick, S. Kahn, A. Simonet, A. Smith, P. Turner
- 2001 Nowhere / Now here; for Mordine & Co.; music, David Pavkovic; film Relatives, directed by Julie Dash
- 2009 The Myth and Trials of Calamity Jane and the Son of the Queen of the Amazons; with Ashley Anderson
- 2009 This Ring of Fire; collaboration with Daniel Safer
- 2010 Revival of What We're Made Of; collaboration with Michael Biello, Dan Martin
- 2010 Revival of DEAD; solo performed by William Robinson
- 2010–2013 Revival of THEM; collaboration with Dennis Cooper & Chris Cochrane
- 2014 13 Love Songs: dot dot dot; collaboration with Emily Wexler
- 2016 Variations on Themes From Lost and Found: Scenes From a Life and Other Works by John Bernd; collaboration with Miguel Gutierrez and composer Nick Hallett

== Awards ==
- 2016 Herb Alpert Award in the Arts
- 2015 Doris Duke Impact Award
- 2013 Foundation for Contemporary Arts Grants to Artists Award
- 2011 New York Dance and Performance "Bessie" Award for THEM, in collaboration with Chris Cochrane and Dennis Cooper
- 1985–1991 National Endowment for the Arts Choreographer Fellowships
- 1985 New York Foundation for the Arts Choreographer Fellowship
- 1984 New York Dance and Performance "Bessie" Award for Cowboys, Dreams and Ladders, in collaboration with Fred Holland
