= Miguel Gutierrez (choreographer) =

American dance and music artist

Miguel Gutierrez (born 1971) is an American choreographer, composer, performer, singer, writer, educator and advocate based in New York City. His multidisciplinary performances "layer quotidian business and seemingly off-the-cuff remarks with strikingly choreographed sequences and lyrical text" and have been presented in more than 60 cities around the world.

== Career ==
A 1989 graduate of the Pingry School, Gutierrez studied dance at Brown University and New York University, eventually dropping out and moving to San Francisco, where he danced in the Joe Goode Performance Group. After moving to New York City in 1996, Guitierrez danced in John Jasperse's company for seven years.

Since 2001, Gutierrez has been creating and performing solo and ensemble dance performances. His work has been presented in venues such as the Centre National de Danse, Centre Pompidou, Festival Universitario, ImPulsTanz, Fringe Arts, Walker Art Center, TBA/PICA, MCA Chicago, Live Arts Bard, American Realness, and the 2014 Whitney Biennial. He has received support from Creative Capital, MAP, National Dance Project, National Performance Network, and Jerome Foundation. He has received fellowships from New York Foundation for the Arts, the Tides Foundation, Guggenheim Foundation, United States Artists, an award from Foundation for Contemporary Art, the Doris Duke Performing Artist Award in 2016, a Franky Award from the Prelude Festival in 2016, and four Bessies. He has been an artist in residence at MANCC, LMCC, Centre Choréographique National de Montpellier, Centre National du Danse Pantin, Baryshnikov Art Center, and Gibney Dance.

He has created music for several of his works, for Antonio Ramos’ work, and with Colin Self for Jen Rosenblit and Simone Aughterlony. He performs with Nick Hallett as Nudity in Dance. He also currently performs a music project called SADONNA: sad versions of upbeat Madonna songs.

== Projects ==
=== DEEP AEROBICS -- Death Electric Emo Protest Aerobics ===
A workout class in costumes playing on the themes of mortality, political protest, oppression, resistance and hope. It is over an hour of communal/political/conceptual/imaginational workout experience in public. It combines bouncing of one’s anatomical/spiritual/energetic molecules with the existential absurdity that is living in a world/country/economic system of injustice, war-mongering, and cultural ineptitude.

=== myendlesslove ===
Performed at Henry Street Settlement in 2006 and then reconstructed in 2013 at Abron Arts Center, the work explores sex, desire and growing older in gay culture. On the heels of one of the major works of his career and the worst breakup of his life, choreographer Miguel Gutierrez created myendlesslove (2006), a short, raw dance about grief. Brooklyn-based Gutierrez incorporates song, text, movement and video into his performance pieces. The new version starts off with Mr. Gutierrez, in person, holding a discussion with himself on video: “What are you going to show us today?” “Whatever happens.” As the question is repeated, the response becomes more lascivious: “I really hope it’s going to look beautiful, that you’re going to try all the possible variations and positions.”

=== Cela nous concerne tous (This concerns all of us) (2017) ===
Created in the fall of 2017 for Ballet de Lorraine in Nancy, France. Premiering during the company's 50th anniversary season, this piece takes its inspiration (and title) from the May 1968 social and political movements in France.

=== Age and Beauty (2014/15) ===
A trilogy of queer pieces that address queer time, futurity, and mid-life anxieties about relevance, sustainability and artistic burnout.

=== Variations on Themes from Lost and Found: Scenes from a Life and other works by John Bernd ===
Co-directed with Ishmael Houston-Jones, received a 2017 Bessie for Outstanding Revival.

=== This Bridge Called My Ass (2019) ===
In This Bridge Called My Ass, six Latinx performers map an elusive choreography of obsessive and perverse action within an unstable terrain of bodies, materials and sound. A formal logic binds the group and propels them to create an ever-transforming world where they are at once autonomous and connected, complicating the idea of identity. Latin-American songs and the form of the telenovela are exploited to show how familiar structures contain absurdity that reveal and celebrate difference. The title is a play on This Bridge Called My Back edited by Cherríe Moraga and Gloria E. Anzaldúa, a seminal 1981 anthology of Third Wave feminist essays that explores identity and critiques white feminism. Gutierrez had been piqued by the book since age 19.

== Teaching ==
Gutierrez has taught regularly at a variety of festivals and intensives such as Forum Dança, La Caldera, ImPulsTanz, Camping/CND, SFADI, Lion's Jaw, American Dance Festival, Bates Dance Festival, MELT at Movement Research, Earthdance, Danza Común, New Aesthetics, Performatica, and Ponderosa and he has been a visiting guest professor at several universities including DOCH, Konstfack, P.A.R.T.S., Bennington College, Hollins University’s MFA Dance Program, School of Art Institute of Chicago’s Low Res MFA Art Program, Yale University’s MFA Program in Sculpture, RISD, Brown University, Carnegie Mellon University, UCLA, Princeton University, CalArts, University of Illinois, The New School/Eugene Lang, New York University's Experimental Theater Wing, Hunter College, and more

He is the program director for LANDING, a community-building, non-academic educational initiative at Gibney.

He invented DEEP AEROBICS in 2007, disseminated it for ten years, and then killed it in 2017. He is also a Feldenkrais Method practitioner.

== Writing and Published Texts ==
His essays have been published in A Life in Dance and In Terms of Performance: A Keywords Anthology and BOMB Magazine ("Does Abstraction Belong to White People").

=== When You Rise Up ===
A book of performance texts published by 53rd State Press. In the texts, Gutierrez gets inside the psyche of the 20- or 30-something generation – people, according to Gutierrez, who often don't know what to do with themselves, where to put their energies, or how to act "powerful" among others. Driving the performance texts is a socio-political conscience, though one hyper-attentive to the clichés of a socially committed, queer-inflected dance culture and public discourse.
