= Clare Cunningham =

Clare Cunningham may refer to:

- Clare Cunningham (athlete), Paralympic swimmer and triathlete
- Clare Cunningham (Hollyoaks), fictional character

== See also ==
- Claire Cunningham, choreographer and dancer
