= Kathleen Hermesdorf =

American dancer (1967–2020)

Kathleen Hermesdorf (January 31, 1967–November 29, 2020) was a dancer, teacher, choreographer, improviser, producer, and curator. She was born in Wisconsin, USA, and was a long-time resident of San Francisco.

== Career in Dance and Choreography ==
From 1998 to 2020, Kathleen co-directed, with musician Albert Mathias, the dance companies ALTERNATIVA and MOTIONLAB, having already worked in a collaborative artistic partnership together since 1995 after meeting as members of Sara Shelton Mann's performance co-op Contraband. Hermesdorf also directed or co-directed several other companies, including Hermesdorf & Wells with Scott Wells, and Collusion with Stephanie Maher. From 2017, she led Fake Company, a group dedicated to collective scored improvisation, which presented events and performances in Berlin and San Francisco.

As a dancer and performer, Kathleen was a core collaborator in the companies of Margaret Jenkins Dance Company (1993–1999), Contraband/Sara Shelton Mann (1993–2008), and Bebe Miller Dance (2002–2009). Hermesdorf obtained a BFA in Dance from Western Michigan University, and an MFA in Dance Performance and Pedagogy from University of Illinois-Champaign.

Based in San Francisco since 1991, Hermesdorf performed and taught across the United States and around the world, including in Mexico, Germany, Austria, the Netherlands, Ireland, Czech Republic, Hong Kong, France, and Senegal. She was widely recognized as a powerful improviser in performance, prompting the Seattle Times to write: "In Hermesdorf’s hands, ordinary movement is distorted into a kind of prowess. Twitches, mood reversals and vernacular gestures twist out of her at crazed velocity. There’s no doubting her stage presence."

== Curatorial and Production work ==
Kathleen was the founder, producer, and co-curator of the FRESH Festival in San Francisco from 2010 to 2020. Playing a crucial role in the Bay Area contemporary dance ecology, the FRESH Festival was described by KQED as a "bastion of experimentation." Recurring artistic guests at FRESH Festival included Sara Shelton Mann, Amara Tabor-Smith, Abby Crain, Brontez Purnell, NAKA, Sherwood Chen, and Keith Hennessy.

== Teaching ==
Hermesdorf was particularly renowned as a teacher of dance and improvisation. Hermesdorf and Mathias developed a unique approach to teaching a hybrid of modern and contemporary approaches to technique, improvisation, and performance presence, supported by Mathias’ beat-driven live electronic music. Hermesdorf’s teaching was influenced by Sara Shelton Mann, especially in adapting qigong to contemporary dance, as well as contact improvisation, various somatic and release techniques, and modern and jazz dance. Besides her ongoing classes in the Bay Area, Kathleen and ALTERNATIVA toured widely, including recurring contributions to both Ponderosa (Berlin and Stolzenhagen, Germany) and Bates Dance Festival (Maine, USA). From 2010 to 2019, Kathleen co-directed, with Stephanie Maher, the PORCH Program at Ponderosa in Stolzenhagen, Germany.

In a 2018 interview with Jill Randall, Kathleen said, "Dance is transformational. It is a way of perceiving the world and a transmission of human and individual experience. It is how I process and prove truth. It is what makes me more alive than anything else."

== Death ==
Kathleen Hermesdorf died on November 29, 2020, of a rare cancer. Memorials were held in Elm Grove, Wisconsin; San Francisco, California; Stolzenhagen, Germany; and online. In an obituary in the San Francisco Chronicle, Rachel Howard wrote that "Hermesdorf embodied punk charisma, with her blond hair and chiseled legs. Like her Contraband peers, Hermesdorf approached her art with fierce energy and uncompromising rawness. But along with these qualities radiated a powerful sense of kindness and generosity — all channeled in movement that was slyly virtuosic."
