= Nick Hallett (composer) =

Nick Hallett (born August 12, 1974) is a composer, vocalist, and cultural producer.

== Biography ==
Hallett trained at Oberlin Conservatory under singing pedagogy authority, Richard Miller.

In New York during the year 2000, he formed the Plantains with Ray Sweeten/The Mitgang Audio, a band uniting cabaret and Electroclash music with video projection and performance art. Hallett's songs were written from the perspective of a fake British alter ego named Nick L. Cat. Plantains shared bills with Le Tigre and Scissor Sisters before disbanding in 2003. In 2004, Hallett and Sweeten recorded a cover of the song "I Feel Love" for a student film by Matt Wolf, which resulted in the duo's only commercial release from this period.

Hallett transitioned into experimental music and contemporary art, as both performer and curator. In 2004, he co-founded the Darmstadt series with Zach Layton. Originally conceived as a casual listening event of avant-garde recordings, Darmstadt quickly began hosting informal, modern-classical music concerts in nightclubs, and within a few years had evolved into a presenter of festivals and large-scale performances of repertory from the experimental music canon. In 2014, for Darmstadt's 10th anniversary, Hallett curated, co-produced, and performed in a new staging of Karlheinz Stockhausen’s Originale at The Kitchen, recognizing the 50th anniversary of the work's storied New York premiere, and cast predominantly with artists who identify as female, queer, transgender, and of color. Darmstadt also presents an annual concert of Terry Riley’s In C.

In 2007, Hallett formed a creative relationship with multimedia artist Joshua White, founder of the Joshua Light Show, an oft-referenced psychedelic concert lighting company, originally active from 1967 to 1970, whose contributions to the fields of expanded cinema and light art have since been recognized in an art historical context. After programming a concert of the Joshua Light Show at The Kitchen, which re-established the group, Hallett became White's music director, positioning the project within experimental rock and electronica. In 2011, Hallett produced the soundscore to Fulldome, a performance by the Joshua Light Show at the Hayden Planetarium of the American Museum of Natural History.

Hallett composed the music and libretto for Whispering Pines 10, an opera collaboration with artist Shana Moulton, based on her video art serial. This was originally staged in 2010 at The Kitchen, sung by Hallett and vocalist Daisy Press, and featuring Moulton as the sole actor, performing within an environment of multichannel video projection. The work, which also featured interactive technology and wearable musical instruments designed by Moulton and Hallett, toured art museums and performance festivals across the United States. In 2013, the duo received a Creative Capital grant to adapt Whispering Pines 10 for the internet. In 2020, at the beginning of the COVID-19 pandemic, the full work premiered as a website.

In 2014, Hallett began a collaboration with the choreographer and director Bill T. Jones, as the composer of a trilogy of scores for the Bill T. Jones/Arnie Zane Company: Analogy/Dora: Tramontane (2015), Analogy/Lance aka Pretty aka The Escape Artist (2016), and Analogy/Ambros: The Emigrant (2017). Hallett has toured with the company as vocalist and multi-instrumentalist in the performances of the Analogy trilogy, and an additional work featuring his music, A Letter to My Nephew. Hallett's scores for dance also include the Bessie-award-winning Variations on Themes from Lost and Found: Scenes from a Life and other works by John Bernd (2016), directed by Ishmael Houston-Jones and Miguel Gutierrez, based upon original choreography and music by John Bernd.

== Awards ==
- 2017 New York Dance and Performance Bessie Award for Outstanding Revival
- 2016 The New York Times, The Best Dance of 2016
- 2015 KQED Arts, Best Live Performance
- 2013 Creative Capital awardee
- 2013 Casement Fund Triangle Grant
- 2012 The Oregonian, Best of Visual Art 2011
