= Fun Down There =

1989 film

- Directed by: Roger Stigliano
- Written by: Roger Stigliano; Michael Waite
- Produced by: Roger Stigliano
- Starring: Michael Waite
- Cinematography: Peggy Ahwesh; Eric Saks
- Edited by: Peggy Ahwesh; Roger Stigliano
- Music by: James Baker; Wayne Hammond
- Distributed by: Frameline
- Release dates: February 1989 (Berlinale); August 17, 1990 (U.S.)
- Running time: 89 minutes
- Country: United States
- Language: English

Fun Down There is a 1989 drama film directed by Roger Stigliano. It stars Michael Waite, who co-wrote the script with Stigliano. It premiered at the 1989 Berlin International Film Festival where it won the Teddy Award for Best Feature Film. It was released onto DVD by Frameline.

== Plot ==
Buddy, a young gay man leaves his small-town home in rural Upstate New York to make a new life in New York City.

== Cast ==
- Yvonne Fisher as Sandy
- Martin Goldin as Angelo
- Nickolas B. Nagourney as Joseph
- Jeanne Smith as Judy Fields
- Gretchen Sommerville as Greta
- Betty Waite as Mrs. Fields
- Harold Waite as Mr. Fields
- Michael Waite as Buddy Fields

== Reception ==
Writing for The New York Times, Vincent Canby called the film "carefully muted [and] seriocomic". He praised lead actor Michael Waite for playing his role with "great inner humor and intelligence".
