= Dan Siegler =

American composer

- Born: New York, New York
- Education: Bennington College (B.A.)
- Occupations: Composer, sound artist
- Awards: Bessie Awards

Dan Siegler is an American composer and sound artist from New York City. During his career, Siegler has ventured into a number of mediums, including dance, live theater, and television. Siegler is a recipient of the Bessie Awards for his work with Pam Tanowitz.

== Early life and education ==
Siegler was born in New York City and began playing piano at the age of four. Siegler has stated that he developed a love for rock music in high school, where he was also involved in friends' theater and dance performances. He attended Bennington College in Bennington, Vermont, where he received his bachelor's degree (B.A.) 1984.

== Career ==
In 1997, Siegler was a recipient of the Abe Olman Scholarship, whose recipients have included artists such as John Legend. Siegler is a recipient of the New York Dance and Performance Awards, more commonly known as the Bessie Awards, having received the award for his work with Pam Tanowitz. During his collaborative efforts with Tanowitz, Siegler notably employed unconventional sounds such as that of running water and "staticky buzzes" to compliment instruments such as the piano and bass. According to The New York Times, Siegler produced the original score to the second half of Tanowitz's "the story progresses as if in a dream of glittering surfaces".

Siegler was a 2019 resident at Art Omi and a composer-resident at Exploring the Metropolis. (EtM) Siegler also received a virtual commission from the Guggenheim Museum in New York, and was formerly an artist-in-residence at the UCLA Center for the Art of Performance (CAP UCLA). As a lecturer, Siegler has taught at the Mason Gross School of the Arts at Rutgers University. Additionally, Siegler has written for publications such as the New York-based Gothamist.

=== Concrète Jungle ===
Siegler is noted for his work of sound art Concrète Jungle, which debuted in 2019. Citing inspiration from the musique concrète method of electroacoustic music, Concrète Jungle was described by The New Yorker as a piece of art that "employs urban sounds, sampled and reorganized, to evoke a bygone New York City". Concrète Jungle was composed through the assemblage of recorded conversations with hundreds of New York residents, with ambient sounds complimented by improvised dancing.

== Musical style ==
According to The New Yorker, Siegler's work has been influenced by the avant-garde jazz genre, hip-hop group Public Enemy, as well as No Wave. In 2013,The New York Times described Siegler's work as one that "teases and goads with brass cadences, drums and the murmur of surf". Siegler has cited composers Hildegard Westerkamp and Pierre Schaeffer as a major influence on his work.

== Personal life ==
Siegler married Pam Tanowitz in 1998. As of 2016, Siegler is a resident of Chelsea, Manhattan.

== Selected works ==
- Concrète Jungle (2018-2021)
- Ghost Sentence (2016)
- Read the Following Before Playing (2015)
- Untitled 4, Pour Hommes (2014)
- The Spectators (2013)
- St Newey Blues (2012)
- The Party I Didn't Go To (2010)
- Unnatural Sounds (2010)
- Be In The Gray With Me (2009); Bessie Award winner
- The Other Side of the Street (2008)
- Errors (2007)
