= John Coletti (author) =

American author

- Education: Columbia University
- Occupation: Author

John Coletti is an American author. He grew up in Santa Rosa, California and Portland, Oregon before moving to New York City. Coletti graduated from Columbia University in 1997.

== Publications ==
John Coletti is the author of the novel Mum Halo (Rust Buckle Books, 2010), and the chapbooks Same Enemy Rainbow (Fewer and Further Press, 2008) and Physical Kind (Portable Press at Yo-Yo Labs and Boku Books, 2005). With Anselm Berrigan, he co-authored the limited edition Skasers (Flowers and Cream Press, 2012). He has served as editor of The Poetry Project Newsletter and co-edits Open 24 Hours Press. Other collaborations include a print with artist Kiki Smith, a chapbook with Shana Moulton, and a libretto for Excelsior, an opera composed by Caleb Burhans commissioned by Chicago's Fifth House Ensemble, which premiered in 2013. His novel Deep Code (City Lights) was published in November 2014.
