= Biello & Martin =

American songwriting duo

Biello & Martin are a songwriting duo working in dance, theatre, and film. Independently, Michael Biello (b. 1951, Philadelphia) is a lyricist, performance artist, and ceramic sculptor. Dan Martin (b. 1952, Philadelphia) is a composer and music producer. They are best known for creating performance works which promote love, spirituality, and self-expression through a Queer lens. As LGBTQ+ cultural activists, they also founded Outmusic, an LGBTQ+ music organization, and have been romantic life-partners for over 40 years.

== Early years ==
In 1976, Biello & Martin formedTwo Men Dancing, a gay men’s dance theater collective started with dancer Ishmael Houston-Jones. They performed at the Philadelphia Gay Cultural Festival in 1977 and 1978, at the Glines’ First Gay American Arts Festival, and at PS 122 in New York (1980).

How I Spent My Summer Vacation (1983) for which Biello created the staging and Martin the music, was their first musical. It was performed at The Painted Bride Art Center in Philadelphia and featured Biello's ceramic masks.

In 1984, Martin wrote, composed, and performed in Xposed, a musical which takes place at a gay male strip-club. With co-written lyrics and staging by Biello, the musical was produced at Philadelphia's Walnut Street Theatre's Studio 5, and was later performed at Washington DC's "DC Space" and the San Francisco People’s Theatre Coalition in 1985. In 1986, they adapted one of the songs, Clones in Love, into a short film of the same title. The film won Best Short Award at the 1985 San Francisco Lesbian & Gay Video Festival.

In 1990, Martin produced the album Homo Love Song, which included the song "The Dance." Director Jim Hubbard subsequently used the song to create his short filmThe Dance about Biello & Martin's relationship during the AIDS era. The film was screened at The Berlin Film Festival and the Museum of Modern Art.

Following the album, the couple created the musical Homo Love Song, a song cycle about their relationship, which premiered at New York City's Gay and Lesbian Community Services Center. The piece was revived in New York at the Home for Contemporary Theatre and Art (1991) and at Brooklyn's Gowanus Arts Exchange (1993).

== LGBTQ+ Cultural Activism ==
In 1990, the couple formed the non-profit Outmusic Inc. to recognize and promote LGBTQ music."

From 1996 to 1999, Biello & Martin presented the Outmusic Award as part of GLAMA (The Gay & Lesbian American Music Awards) to recording artists who advanced LGBTQ+ music through their work as out-musicians. Award recipients included Boy George, Ferron, Meshell Ndegeocello, Ani DiFranco, and RuPaul. From 2001 to 2007 Biello & Martin produced the Outmusic Awards to further celebrate excellence in LGBTQ+ music and cultural activism.

== Musical Theatre ==
=== BMI Lehman Engel Musical Theatre Workshop ===
In 1992, Biello & Martin joined BMI Lehman Engel Musical Theatre Workshop, and two years later, began working under the mentorship of composer Maury Yeston.

=== Fairy Tales/Breathe ===
In 1996, Biello & Martin created the musical Fairy Tales, which premiered at Provincetown's Unitarian Universalist Meeting House. Inspired by its namesake, the musical explores spirituality in the context of gay male milestones through a cycle of short fairytale-like operettas. The piece was renamed Breathe for a 1997 run at Christ Church, Philadelphia in the city's first Fringe Festival. In 1999, it was performed at Bailiwick Repertory Theatre, where it won the After Dark Award for Outstanding New Work. Further productions took place in Omaha (2003), where it was nominated for eight TAG Awards, Philadelphia (2004), Richmond (2005), Dallas (2009), at New York City's Off-Broadway York Theatre for a staged reading (2012), and in Orlando (2016).

=== Q - The Songs of Biello & Martin ===
In 2000, Biello & Martin returned to Bailiwick Repertory Theatre to present Q - The Songs of Biello & Martin, an LGBTQ+ Revue consisting of eighteen songs celebrating the couple's twenty-fifth anniversary of musical collaboration, in a summer Pride series. The show features songs about various aspects of queer life performed by gay, lesbian, and transgender characters. Subsequent productions took place during the 2002 Philly Fringe Festival at the couple's workspace, Biello Martin Studio, and then later at Philadelphia’s Walnut Street Theatre 5 (2008), and in Allentown PA (2010).

=== The Cousins Grimm ===
Biello & Martin created the musical The Cousins Grimm with book writer Ted Sod in 2007. The fictional musical centers around two cousins who decide to update their ancestors' stories, Grimms' Fairy Tales, with queer themes. Developmental readings took place in the New York Musical Theatre Festival, at the Arden Theatre Company (Philadelphia) through the Philadelphia Gay & Lesbian Theatre Festival, and at the York Theatre in 2007. An additional developmental workshop took place at the Eugene O'Neill Theater Center in 2008, and in 2009, they premiered a more complete version in Chicago, again with the Bailiwick Repertory Theatre. In 2015, a revised version of the musical was presented in London as a part of Aria Entertainment’s From Page to Stage Festival of New Musicals.

=== In My Body ===
In collaboration with book writers Elisabeth Kalogris, Katherine Cipriano, and Melissa Hays, Biello & Martin created In My Body, a musical about body-image and self-worth. It premiered in 2016 at Philadelphia's Prince Music Theater.

=== Marry Harry ===
In 2013, Biello & Martin, in collaboration with book writer Jennifer Robbins Manocherian, premiered the musical comedy Marry Harry for the New York Musical Theatre Festival. The musical is about Little Harry and Sherri, two romantics with controlling parents who, despite their families' wishes, fall in love. Performers featured in various productions include Annie Golden, Lenny Wolpe, and Veanne Cox. The musical moved on to an American Theatre Group production in 2013, and then to an Off-Broadway production at York Theatre in 2017.

=== Michael & Dan's Amazing Queer Songbook ===
After 40 years of partnership and collaboration, Biello & Martin created Michael & Dan's Amazing Queer Songbook, an online musical memoir. The ongoing project documents the couple's life and career through archival performance documentation, interviews, and new video recordings of their songs.
