= Philip Trevino =

American Lighting and Scenic Designer

Philip Treviño
- Born: February 4, 1976 (age 50); Livermore, California, U.S.
- Education: San Francisco State University
- Awards: Bessie Awards
- Website: philiptrevino.com

Philip Treviño (born 1976) is a Chicano (Mexican-American) theatrical designer based in New York.

== Biography ==
Philip Treviño is a lighting designer and scenic designer for the theater and has worked primarily in Dance. The New York Times has called him "a set-and-lighting design wizard capable of his own magic."

In 2010, he was awarded a New York Dance and Performance Award (Bessie Awards) for Pam Tanowitz’s Be In The Gray With Me as both lighting and scenic designer.

He was the Scenic Designer for Camille A. Brown and Company’s Mr. Tol E. Rance, winner of a 2014 Bessie Award for Outstanding Production.

Philip Treviño is a member of Pioneers Go East Collective, an "award-winning collective of multigenerational and cross-cultural artists and activists focused on the mutual exchange of ideas and culture. Inspired by W. Whitman’s poem Pioneers, O Pioneers!, an homage to the pioneers' search for a brighter future – the collective is comprised of thought-provoking artists from diverse backgrounds who come together to share their experiences. In residence at two historical institutions - La MaMa and Judson Church - the collective centers the voices of LGBTQ and Feminist artists to build deeper relationships with members of lesser-heard communities in New York City and beyond."

He has designed and worked with:

- Martha Graham Dance Company
- Brian Brooks Moving Company
- Camille A. Brown
- Henning Rübsam's SENSEDANCE
- Kymera Dance
- Pam Tanowitz Dance

His work has toured nationally, internationally, and to the notable venues Brooklyn Academy of Music (BAM), Joyce Theatre, Joyce Soho, Dance Theatre Workshop (DTW), New York Live Arts, Lincoln Center Out of Doors, The Kitchen, La MaMa Experimental Theatre Club, New York City Center, and Jacob’s Pillow.

Alternately, Philip has Production Stage Managed for:

- Trisha Brown Dance Company
- José Limón Dance Company
- Wally Cardona Quartet’s Everywhere and SITE
- Kate Weare Company
- Christopher Williams’ The Golden Legend

== Education ==
Philip Treviño graduated in 2000 from San Francisco State University with a Bachelor of Arts in Drama and minor in Music. The areas of emphasis in his major were acting and technical theatre.

== Teaching ==
Philip Treviño is a teacher, from 2006–present, of stagecraft and design at Marymount Manhattan College where he was the technical director until 2022 for the Dance Department.

== Awards ==
- 2010 New York Dance and Performance Award (Bessie Awards) in Lighting and Scenic Design for Pam Tanowitz’s Be In The Gray With Me.
- 2018 Rosco Gobo Design Contest Winner for his design of the gobo Square Radiant.
