= Nick Hallett =

Nick Hallett may refer to:

- Nick Hallett (composer)
- Nick Hallett (Canadian football)
