= Rosalind Newman =

Rosalind Newman (born November 12, 1946) is veteran choreographer who has created a body of over 70 works.

== Career ==
Newman's original New York City company, Rosalind Newman and Dancers, had major seasons in New York at the Joyce Theater and Dance Theater Workshop. The company toured the US and Europe performing in many prestigious international festivals and venues such as Jacob's Pillow Dance Festival, Paris International Dance Festival, Holland Festival, the Dance Umbrella and Sadler's Wells Theatre in London, and the Academy of Arts in Berlin. The company received funding from the National Endowment for the Arts, New York State Council on the Arts, and foundations. Choreographer Tere O'Connor danced with Newman's company before beginning his own career as a choreographer.

Founding artistic director and choreographer of Dance HK/NY in Hong Kong, the company had successful seasons in Hong Kong and on international tours to Taiwan and the United States, including New York. Support came from the Hong Kong Arts Development Council, Asian Cultural Council, and Shanghai Tang.

As a senior lecturer in modern dance at the Hong Kong Academy for Performing Arts works choreographed for the Academy dance ensembles were performed in Hong Kong and toured to festivals in Korea, India, the Philippines, China, Australia, France, Czechoslovakia and the US.

Newman has also set her works on a number of companies including London Contemporary Dance Theatre, Pacific Northwest Ballet, and Diversions Dance in Wales. She has taught widely as guest artist and teacher at the Western Australia Academy for Performing Arts, Rotterdam Dance Academy, Dance Forum/Taipei, Guangdong Modern Dance Company/China, and London Contemporary Dance School.

Newman has been recognized with fellowships including the Guggenheim Foundation, New York Foundation for the Arts, National Endowment for the Arts, and the Hong Kong Dance Alliance Award for Choreography. She was the keynote speaker on Global Dance Today at the annual American Dance Guild conference in 2004, and was awarded a Distinguished Alumni Award from the University of Wisconsin School of Education in 2006.

Newman was course leader in the master’s graduate program in choreography at the Laban Dance Centre in London and is co-chair and on the faculty of the Conservatory of Dance, Purchase College, State University of New York.

Recent commissions include a work for Dancing Wheels in Cleveland, Ohio, a company of integrated performers including wheel chair performers, and works performed in Hong Kong. Her works have been performed at the TARI ‘05 and ‘07 international dance festival in Kuala Lumpur, Malaysia. Newman was artist in residence at North Carolina School of the Arts in Spring 2006, and artist in residence at Western Australia Academy for the Performing Arts, Perth, Australia in Spring 2007.
