= Claire Cunningham =

British choreographer and dancer

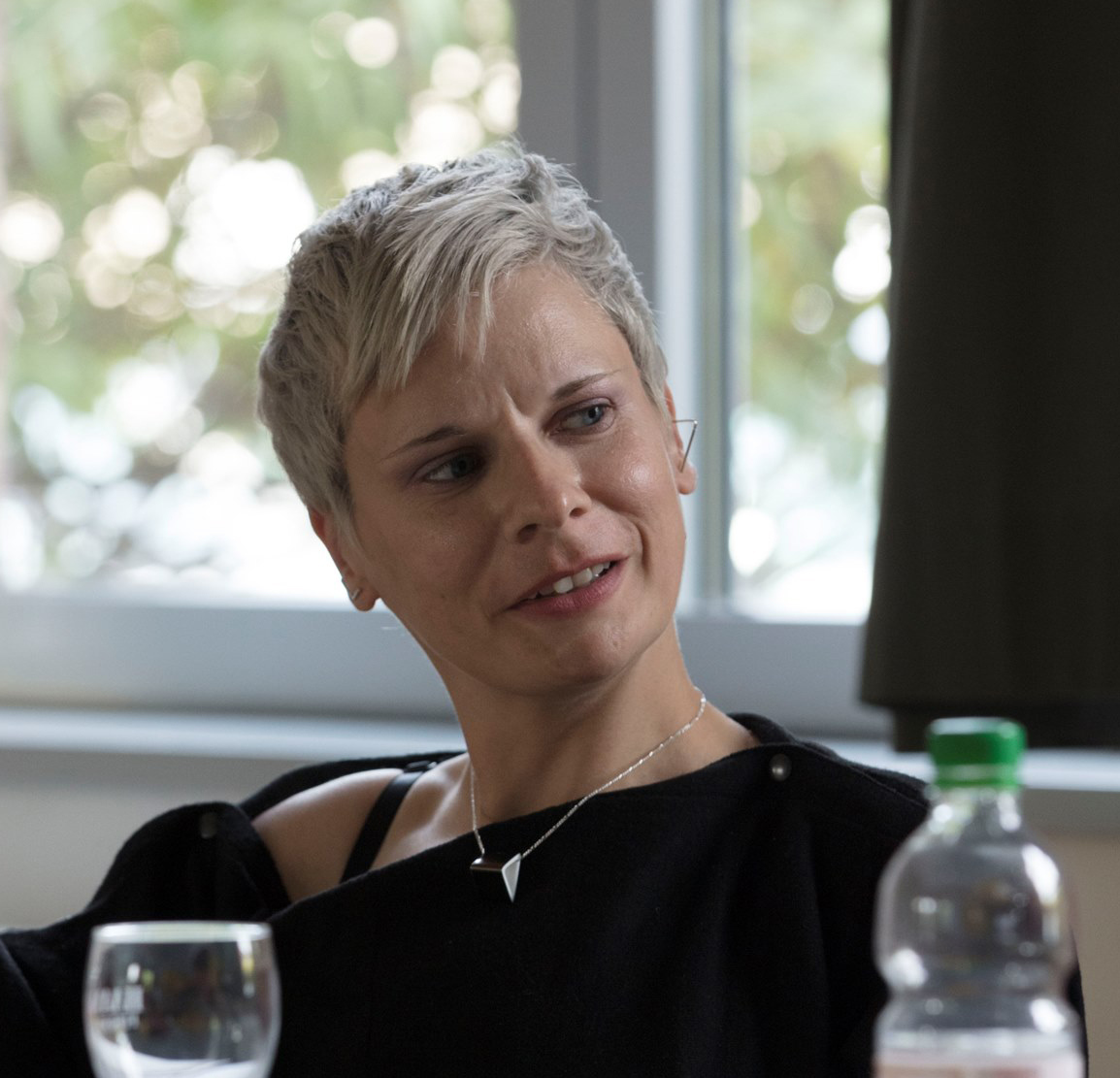
- in September 2017
- Born: 1977 (age 48–49)
- Occupations: Choreographer and dancer
- Known for: dancer who performs on crutches
- Awards: Best Design- Critics Award (2013); Creative Scotland Award (2014); German Dance Price distinction(May 2021)

Claire Cunningham (born 1977) is a Scottish choreographer and dancer who performs on crutches. She creates dances and sculpture that involve crutches for people of all abilities. She identifies herself as a disabled person.

== Life ==
Cunningham was born with osteoporosis, a progressive bone disease and as result she labels herself as disabled. She lived in Ayrshire, but now lives in Glasgow. She has created work with the National Theatre of Scotland.

Claire Cunningham is one of the UK's most esteemed disabled artists. Cunningham's work challenges normativity and explores the potential for experimental dance techniques. Her work, as a choreographer, is conscious of the non-normative body and the societal implications of living a disabled experience. Cunningham works in multiple art forms including intimate solo shows to large ensemble work.

Her 2014 dance "Give Me a Reason to Live" is based on the depiction of "cripples" in the work of the Dutch painter Hieronymus Bosch. She dedicated this work to protest at the British cuts to funding and the Nazi Euthanasia Programme.

== Works include ==
- Guide Gods

"Guide Gods", performed in the Church of Our Lady & St. Nicholas, as a part of Dada Fest, was developed through a research trip to Cambodia. There Cunningham was exposed to the ideas of reincarnation and also the dated idea that disability is punishment for sins committed in a previous life. The resulting piece seeks to bridge a gap between cultural ideas and the shared human experience. It combines interviews with religious leaders, music, and Cunningham's unique experience.

- Give me a Reason to Live

"Give me a Reason to Live," is a 2015 dance based on the artwork " The Garden of Earthly Delights," by the Dutch medieval painter Hieronymous Bosch. The piece is in protest against British funding cuts. This piece explores the role of empathy, religion, and the judgment of bodies and souls.

- The Way You Look (at me) Tonight created with Jess Curtis and Dr Alva Noë

"The Way You Look at Me Tonight," is a choreographed duet with Cunningham's long time collaborator, Jess Curtis. The piece is performed as a tutorial in how to deal with age, ability, sexuality and the intersection of gender. In one act of the dance Cunningham and Curtis perform on crutches and sing a Scottish Hymn atop a ladder.

- ME (Mobile/Evolution) (2009)

"ME (Mobile/Evolution)" is a solo performance where she creates a spectacle of her mobility from the ground. Treating her crutches like old friends, she takes the audience on a journey of their history and "slowly begins to build them into a swinging mobile structure"

- 12
- Beyond the Breakwater

"Beyond Breakwater" is an on-site, seaside, performance that explores the 'choreography of work' and the multi-use of crutches. Cunningham uses the crutches in her piece as a 'sculpture' allowing for the spectacle to be viewed over the passing of time.

- Thank You Very Much

"Thank You Very Much" is a choreographed performance that explores the question, "What does it mean to try and learn to move like someone else?". Cast is dressed as a sea of Elvis Presley impersonators pelvic-thrusting and gyrating rebelliously while celebrating their imperfections.

- Resemblance (2014)

"Resemblance" is a solo performance centering around Cunningham mirroring the assembly of a crutch as a soldier would a gun. This ritualistic statement piece was performed in a series of short films called 'World War 1 Shorts: Does It Matter?'.

- Ménage Á Trois (2013)

"Ménage Á Trois" is an intimate piece about loneliness, love and the manipulation of her crutch. Through the use of dance theatre, Cunningham depicts a story of a woman constructing her perfect male companion from the one thing she relies on daily, her crutch. Both a clever metaphor for a companion and an everyday item she relies on, she explores the question, "Is it possible to find love when there are already three of you in the relationship".

== Collaboration ==
Jess Curtis is an experimental dancer based out of California. Curtis and Cunningham have collaborated on the piece " The Way You Look Tonight."

== Awards ==
Cunningham received the Creative Scotland Award in 2014.

Cunningham received the ' Best Design- Critics Award for Theatre in Scotland (CATS)' in 2013.

She was in May 2021 honoured with a German Dance Price distinction (including 5000 Euros).
