= Susan Rethorst =

American choreographer, writer and teacher

- Born: 1951 (age 74–75); Washington, D.C.
- Website: http://susanrethorst.com/

Susan Rethorst is an American choreographer, writer, and teacher.

== Biography ==
Susan Rethorst was born in Washington, D.C., in 1951. She began creating modern dance works in 1975. Rethorst studied dance with Judith Dunn (of Judson Dance Theater) at Bennington College and graduated in 1974. Some of performance practices have included "dailiness" and "stealing". Rethorst's work has been presented by the Whitney Museum, the Museum of Modern Art, The Kitchen, Dance Theater Workshop, Danspace Project at St. Mark's Church, and other locations throughout the United States. Internationally her work has been produced internationally by the Holland Festival (Amsterdam), Teatro Spazio Zero (Rome), the Kunsthalle Basel, Danse A Aix Festival (Aix-en-Provence, France), The Room Festival (Jerusalem), among others.

As a teacher she has developed B.A. and post-graduate programs in Copenhagen, Cork, Salzburg, and Amsterdam, as well as the MFA Program in Choreography at the Amsterdam School of the Arts.

In 2012 her book A Choreographic Mind: Autobodygraphical Writings was published by the Helsinki Theatre Academy, which was named one of the Best Books of 2012 by The New Yorker.

== Performance work ==
- Long Sleepless Afternoons (1979)
- The Plunge (1981)
- Stealing (1982)
- Sons of Famous Men (1985)
- Beau Regard (1989)
- Picture This (1992)
- Little By Little, She Showed Up (1995)
- Behold Bold Sam Dog (2001)
- 208 East Broadway series (2007-2013)
- THEN (2014)
- Stealing from Myself (2018)

== Awards ==
- Bessie Awards (1985, 2008)
- Guggenheim Fellowship (1999)
- Foundation for Contemporary Arts Grants to Artists award (2003)
- Alpert Awards in the Arts for Dance (2010)
- Pew Fellowships in the Arts (2014)
- Doris Duke Performing Artist Award Impact Award
