= Blondell Cummings =

American dancer and choreographer (1944–2015)

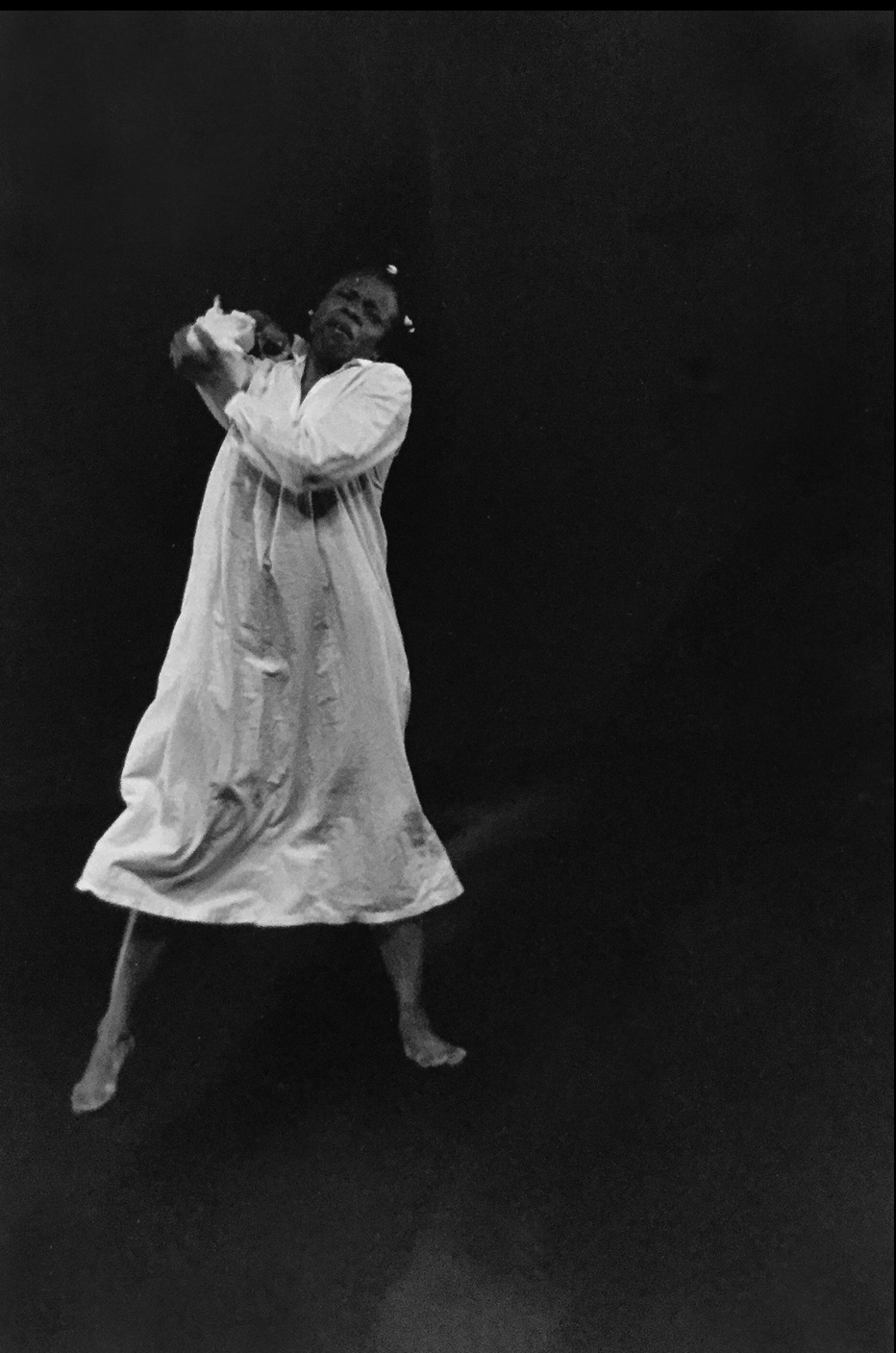
- Cummings in her "for J.B." at the Kitchen in New York City
- Born: October 27, 1944; Florence, South Carolina, USA
- Died: August 30, 2015 (aged 70); New York City, USA
- Education: New York University; Lehman College
- Known for: Dance and choreography
- Movement: Modern dance

Blondell Cummings (October 27, 1944 – August 30, 2015) was an American modern dancer and choreographer. She is known for her experimental choreography and was a fixture in the New York and Harlem dance scene for decades.

== Early life ==
Blondell Cummings was born in Florence, South Carolina, on October 27, 1944. When she was an infant, her parents, Roscoe and Oralee (née Williams) Cummings, moved from South Carolina to Harlem. In South Carolina, her parents had been sharecroppers, growing cotton and tobacco, and when they moved to New York, her father worked as a cab driver and her mother as a domestic aid then a nurse. When Cummings was in her teens, her family relocated to Queens.

== Career ==
Cummings received a bachelor's degree in dance and education from New York University and a master's in fine arts from Lehman College. She also studied at the Martha Graham School of Contemporary Dance.

She was a founding member of Meredith Monk's company "The House". Cummings appeared in Monk's 1973 opera Education of the Girlchild and Yvonne Rainer's 1976 film Kristina Talking Pictures. By 1978 she created her own art collective, Cycle Arts Foundation, which promoted interdisciplinary collaboration. She spent two years (1978–79) as an artist-administrator for the Cultural Council Foundation CETA Artists Project in New York City, overseeing other dancers as well as choreographing and dancing her own pieces. Cummings went on to perform her work at venues including The Kitchen, New York Live Arts, Danspace Project, 92Y, and others. She also toured widely across Africa and Asia, as well as across the country to venues including the Jacob's Pillow Dance Festival where she was an artist in residence. Throughout her career, Cummings collaborated with artists including Jamaica Kincaid, Jessica Hagedorn and Ishmael Houston-Jones.

She taught at universities, including Wesleyan, Cornell University, and New York University.

Cummings died from pancreatic cancer on August 30, 2015, in her home at Manhattan, New York City at the age of 70.

== Select works ==
=== Chicken Soup (1981) ===
One of Cummings's most well-known works was Chicken Soup, a 1981 solo based on her childhood memories of her grandmother in the kitchen, featuring music by Meredith Monk, Collin Walcott, and Brian Eno. In 1982 when Ishmael Houston-Jones created the Parallels series at Danspace, Chicken Soup was the hit.

In a review of a 1983 performance of the work, the New York Times observed,

All she did was stand beside a shopping bag, sit in a kitchen chair, scrub the floor and dance with a frying pan. But she plunged the viewer into a remembered time and place, when the ladies of the neighborhood sat around a kitchen table as real as any Walker Evans photographed and talked of "childhood, friends, operations, death and money."

In a more recent article on Ishmael Houston-Jones, Joan Acocella of The New Yorker, wrote of the piece,

In 1981 Blondell Cummings made a dance, "Chicken Soup," in which, while scrubbing a floor on her hands and knees—an act of exemplary realism—she would repeatedly break off, rear up, and shake, in jagged, convulsive movements, as if she were in a strobe light. Then, with no acknowledgement of this interruption, she would go back, serenely, to scrubbing the floor. This strange back and forth made the piece very interesting psychologically: the floor-scrubbing so homey and soapy and nice (Cummings wore a white dress), the convulsions so violent and weird. Was this woman happy doing this domestic task, or did she hate it so much that she was going crazy?

The National Endowment for the Arts designated Chicken Soup an American Masterpiece in 2006. As part of this designation, the work was reconstructed and re-staged at the Joyce Theater in 2007 by the dance company Urban Bush Women.

=== Women in the Dunes (1995) ===
Commissioned by the Japan Society, this piece explores points of comparison and contrast between the experiences of an African-American woman and a Japanese woman. This piece was a collaboration with Junko Kikuchi and was based on the 1962 novel by Kōbō Abe titled The Woman in the Dunes.

== Awards ==
Cummings received awards from the National Endowment for the Arts, The New York Foundation for the Arts, the U.S.-Japan Friendship Commission, and received Guggenheim and Robert Rauschenberg fellowships.

== Legacy ==
Cummings was included in the documentaries Retracting Steps: American Dance Since Postmodernism (1988) and the PBS series Free to Dance: The African American Presence in Modern Dance (2001).

A testament to her reputation in the dance scene and performance community, Cummings was on the Bessie Award Selection Committee in for many years.

=== We Wanted a Revolution: Black Radical Women, 1965–85 ===
Cummings is included in this major group exhibit curated by Catherine Morris of the Brooklyn Museum's Elizabeth A. Sackler Center for Feminist Art and Rujeko Hockley, currently a curator at the Whitney Museum of American Art. This exhibit was first shown at the Brooklyn Museum (April 21, 2017 – September 17, 2017) and traveled to the Institute of Contemporary Art, Boston in the summer of 2018 (June 27, 2018 – September 30, 2018).
