= Joshua White (artist) =

American artist

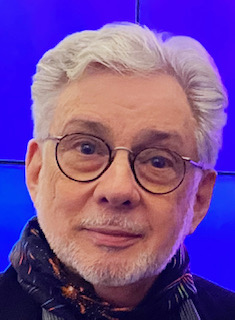
- Born: December 1942 (age 83); New York, U.S.
- Education: Carnegie Tech; USC Film School
- Known for: Joshua Light Show

Joshua White (born 1942) is an American artist, video maker and broadcast television director. Best known for The Joshua Light Show, a 1960s and 1970s liquid light show, his work is in the permanent collection of the Museum of Modern Art in New York and has been exhibited at Museum of Contemporary Art, Los Angeles, the Whitney Museum of American Art, the Hirshhorn Museum, the New Museum, the Hayden Planetarium, the Barbican Center in London, the Centre Pompidou in Paris, The Broad Museum in Los Angeles, and the New-York Historical Society as well as many other venues.

== Early life and education ==
Born in December 1942, Joshua White's parents were first-generation American Jews whose families fled Russia to escape the Czarist pogroms. His father, Lawrence White (né Weiss) was a successful radio and television producer. White attended Elisabeth Irwin High School in New York's Greenwich Village, a haven for left wing intellectuals during the time of McCarthyism. White often spent afternoons at the MoMA, where he became particularly fascinated by a small kinetic sculpture titled Vertical Sequence II, Opus 137, 1941, a "Lumia" by the self-taught artist Thomas Wilfred (1889-1968).

After attending Carnegie Tech Drama School and USC Film School, White returned to New York, where he found work on exploitation films such as Girl on a Chain Gang, I was a Teenage Mother and Who Killed Teddy Bear?, starring Sal Mineo.

== Early work ==
In 1965, White apprenticed himself to the multi-media artist Bobb Goldsteinn, who presented a weekly series of downtown loft parties featuring lights, a mirror ball, slides and films all projected on multiple screens. In 1966, White formed a company with Kip Cohen, John Morris, Thomas Shoesmith and William Schwarzbach called "Sensefex". In addition to discotheques, they designed industrial shows for Dupont, IBM, and Time-Life, and a fashion show for dress designer Tiger Morse, staged in the swimming pool of the Henry Hudson Hotel.

In 1967, Sensefex was hired by the promoter Bill Graham for his new East Coast presentation "The San Francisco Scene", to be staged in Toronto and featuring Jefferson Airplane and the Grateful Dead. White was exposed for the first time to what was going on in San Francisco; one attraction in particular was Jerry Abrams & Glenn McKay's "Headlights", a Bay Area light show. Afterwards, Sensefex became solely focused on creating and performing light shows.

== Joshua Light Show ==
Later that year White founded the Joshua Light Show (JLS). The first week of bookings was in a theater on Long Island behind Frank Zappa, Vanilla Fudge, Ravi Shankar and others. By 1968 the Joshua Light Show was backing all the artists at Crawdaddy magazine's weekend shows at the Anderson Theater (66 2nd Avenue). Impressed by the success of those shows, Bill Graham opened his own theater two blocks away. On March 28, 1968, the Fillmore East opened with Albert King, Tim Buckley, Janis Joplin with Big Brother and the Holding Company, and at every show, The Joshua Light Show.

The JLS has also provided visual backgrounds for the Grateful Dead, the Who, Jefferson Airplane, the Doors, Lou Reed, and Television and others. The light show appeared on the back cover of Jimi Hendrix's album Band of Gypsies and the front cover of Iron Butterfly's album In-A-Gadda-Da-Vida.

That same year, John Schlesinger started production on Midnight Cowboy. For a key party scene, he wanted a Warhol's Factory type party and hired the Joshua Light Show to create the environment.

After touring Europe with The Chambers Brothers in the summer of 1969, the Joshua Light Show performed at the Newport Jazz Festival, Fillmore at Tanglewood, and the Woodstock Music and Art Fair. The Joshua Light Show continued at the Fillmore, including the Jimi Hendrix New Year's Eve 1969-70 performance. Meanwhile, White was negotiating his exit. Three years after the Fillmore first opened its doors, the light show changed its name to Joe's Lights, and White moved on.

== Joshua Television ==
In 1970 White invented Joshua Television, an electronic light show using large screen video magnification. Along with White's partner Lee Erdman and director Lynn Goldsmith, Joshua Television provided big screen projections for many acts at Madison Square Garden, LA Forum, Hollywood Bowl, and The Spectrum in Philadelphia, and several shows for the Fillmore at Tanglewood for acts such as Led Zeppelin and the Grateful Dead. Often, these concerts were videotaped. Network television discovered rock and roll, first with ABC's Shindig in 1962, and in 1971, ABC started a late night rock series called In Concert. It been created by Don Kirshner. However, after the first episode with Alice Cooper, ABC brought in David Sontag to take over the show and executive produce. He hired Joshua White to direct. Sontag left after the first season in 1971 to produce a movie he had written. Don Kirshner launched his version of In Concert on ABC, produced by Kirshner in 1972, then Dick Clark and later by White himself.

In addition to rock television, White staged the first rock concert at Radio City Music Hall. He created the analog projection for the Broadway show The Night That Made America Famous starring Harry Chapin. He also directed for television the National Theater of the Deaf's version of Dylan Thomas' A Child's Christmas in Wales, narrated by Sir Michael Redgrave, and a special with Alvin Ailey celebrating the music of Duke Ellington. Both shows were nominated for Emmy Awards. White was also nominated for an Emmy for Cat Stevens' Moon & Star, A Late Night Special on ABC.

== Broadcast television ==
Between 1974 and 2006, White directed a wide range of broadcast and cable television: The California Jam, Neil Diamond Live in Australia, The Mickey Mouse Club, the Jerry Lewis Telethon, Delta House, Pirates of Penzance Live in Central Park, Laurie Anderson's Oh Superman, Max Headroom, Encyclopedia for HBO, Club MTV, Inside the Actors Studio and Seinfeld.

White was executive director for the launch of the original TV Food Network At the millennium, he became the senior executive in charge of production at Pseudo.com. Pseudo was a pioneer in streaming multi-channel programming on the internet.

== Art ==
In 1996, White began a long collaborative relationship with the artist Michael Smith. Over the next two decades, they produced five large scale projects beginning with the "Mus-co" exhibition at Lauren Wittels Gallery, "Open House" at the New Museum in 1999, "Quinquag: Arts and Wellness Center Traveling Exhibition" in 2001 and 2013, "Take Off Your Pants" in 2005 and "Mike's World: Michael Smith and Joshua White (and other collaborators) in 2007 and 2008.

In 2002, White met the cartoonist and painter Gary Panter, better known as the designer of The Pee-wee Herman Show. They began collaborating on light shows, beginning the third incarnation of the Joshua Light Show, which continues to perform. Beginning with a series of performances at the Anthology Film Archives in 2004, the Joshua Light Show performs at festivals, museums and venues such as the Skirball Center, Abrons Art Center, the Museum of Contemporary Art Detroit, the Hayden Planetarium, the Barbican Centre, UC Davis, and the San Francisco Exploratorium. In 2007, the light show formed a relationship with composer and curator Nick Hallett. The Joshua Light Show has also been featured in museum exhibitions such as "Visual Music" at the Hirshhorn Museum in Washington DC and "The Summer of Love", originating at the Tate Liverpool, then travelling to Frankfurt, Vienna and the Whitney Museum in 2008. The Joshua Light Show's "Liquid Loops" was recently included in the exhibition "60-'69” at the Museum of Modern Art and was acquired by the museum for their permanent collection. In 2014 White collaborated with the artist Guy Richards Smit to create the video/installation/performance project "The Grossmalerman Show." In 2018 White was commissioned by Yale University to create a film about modern work inspired by Thomas Wilfred's Lumia Machine. White created the light show for the traveling museum installation BILL GRAHAM and the Rock 'n Roll Revolution. In 2019 White produced special psychedelic material for the rock band Metallica with the San Francisco Symphony Orchestra conducted by Michael Tilson Thomas.

== Personal life ==
White has two sisters, actress Deborah White and Dr. Rebecca Mercer-White. From 1964 to 1970, White was in a relationship with the actress Swoosie Kurtz.

In 1975, White met Broadway actress and singer Alice Playten. They were married until Playten's death in 2011.
