= Pam Tanowitz =

American choreographer (born 1969)

Photo by Rick Guest with Olivia Pomp

Pam Tanowitz (born 1969) is an American dancer, choreographer, professor, and founder of the company, Pam Tanowitz Dance. She is a current staff member at Rutgers University's Mason Gross School of the Arts where she teaches dance and choreography. Her work has been performed at notable performance venues such as the Joyce Theater, the Joyce SoHo, and New York Live Arts, Kennedy Center for the Performing Arts.

== Early life and education ==
Pam Tanowitz grew up outside of New York City, in Westchester County. She began taking modern and jazz classes at the Steffi Nossen School of Dance in the fourth grade. In the eighth grade, her mother signed her up for the dance intensive, Ethical Culture Fieldson School located in the Bronx. At the intensive, she studied with Blondell Cummings where she had he first improvisation class and also studied with Ohad Naharin. Tanowitz took ballet later on in highschool and in college as a dance major where she had grown an interest in the style. She earned a BFA in Dance from Ohio State University. In her senior year of college, Tanowitz attended the American Dance Festival, where she was immersed in works such as Molissa Fenley, Bill T. Jones, and Paul Taylor. She also took classes with artists such as Ishmael Houston-Jones, Sally Silvers, and Mark Dendy. The American Dance Festival is where Tanowitz was inspired to her connection of making work and being an artist. A few years later, Tanowitz got her MFA in Dance from Sarah Lawrence College, where she was mentored by former Merce Cunningham dancer, Viola Farber.

== Career ==
Dance companies such as the Martha Graham Dance Company, the Paul Taylor Dance Company, and the New York City Ballet have commissioned works by Tanowitz. Gia Kourlas, a dance critic for The New York Times, describes Tanowitz as a "modern choreographer much admired for the way she recharges classical steps." Roslyn Sulcas, dance critic for The New York Times, says "Tanowitz, who worked in relative obscurity for a long time, is a kind of choreographic collector, a passionate student of dance history, techniques and styles. Her work deploys physical ideas and images from Petipa, Balanchine, Merce Cunningham, Martha Graham, Erick Hawkins, Nijinsky and more, but shifts lightly among them. And it doesn’t matter whether you know or recognize any of it. There is no insistence in Tanowitz’s work; its beauties flower and dematerialize before your eyes."

== Works ==
- Forevermore (2007)
- Dream Sequence (No Secrets) (2008)
- Be in the gray with me (2009)
- The Wanderer Fantasy (2010)
- Fortune (2011), The Juilliard School
- Untitled (the Blue Ballet) (2012)
- The Spectators (2013)
- Passagen (2014)
- Heaven on One's Head (2014)
- Broken Story (Wherein There Is No Ecstasy) (2015)
- Early That Summer (2016), Ballet Austin
- thunder rolling along afterward (2016), The Juilliard School
- The story progresses as if in a dream of glittering surfaces (2016)
- Sequenzas in Quadrilles (2016)
- New Work for Goldberg Variations (2017)
- Four Quartets (2018)
- Untitled (Souvenir) (2019), Martha Graham Dance Company
- Bartók Ballet (2019), New York City Ballet
- Gustave Le Gray, No.1 (2019), Miami City Ballet & Dance Theater of Harlem
- all at once (2019), Paul Taylor Dance Company
- Time is forever dividing itself toward innumerable futures (2019)
- Everyone Keeps Me (2019), The Royal Ballet
- Gustave Le Gray, No. 2 (2020)
- Finally Unfinished: Part 1 (2020)
- Watermark (2021), The Australian Ballet
- I was waiting for the echo of a better day (2021)
- Law of Mosaics (2022), New York City Ballet
- Dispatch Duet (2022), The Royal Ballet
- Song of Songs (2022)
- Secret Things (2023), The Royal Ballet
- Day for Night (2024)
- Or Forevermore (2024), The Royal Ballet
- Pastoral (2025)
- Coincident Dances (2025), Miami City Ballet
- Messengers, Maidens, and the End of Something Else (2026), Paul Taylor Dance Company

*all work made for Pam Tanowitz Dance unless otherwise noted

== Awards and recognition ==
- 2009 Bessie Award
- 2010 Foundation for Contemporary Arts Grants to Artists Award
- 2011 Guggenheim Fellowship
- 2016 Center For Ballet and the Arts Fellow
- 2016 Bessie Juried Award
- 2017 Baryshnikov Art Center Cage Cunningham Fellowship
- 2019 first-ever Choreographer in Residence at the Richard B. Fisher Center for the Performing Arts at Bard College in Annandale-on-Hudson, New York
- 2019 Herb Alpert Award in the Arts
- 2020 Doris Duke Artist Award
