= Joya Powell =

American choreographer, educator, and activist

Joya Powell (born January 15, 1979, in Manhattan), also known as Joya Powell-Goldstein, is a Bessie Award-winning choreographer, educator, and activist. As the founding artistic director of Movement of the People Dance Company, she is known for creating politically scorching dance-theatre that confronts issues of race and justice.

== Early life and education ==
Powell was born to a Jamaican mother and Jewish father in Manhattan, where she was raised in Harlem. In her youth, she studied violin at The Harlem School of The Arts and dance at Dance Theatre of Harlem. After graduating from LaGuardia High School with a concentration in Theatre, Powell received her BA from Columbia University in Latin American Studies and Creative Writing and her MA from NYU Steinhardt School in Dance Education.

While at Columbia, Powell spent two years studying abroad in Salvador Bahia, Brazil to expand her cultural awareness. After graduating from Columbia she returned to Bahia for 2 more years before enrolling at NYU. During this period she was the house translator, photographer, archivist, and international representative of the Afro-Brazilian Carnival group, Ilê Aiyê, whose teachers taught her Samba Afro, dances of the Orixás, art as activism, and drumming. She also studied at Fundação Cultural da Bahia where she deepened her knowledge in contemporary dance, baile folclorico do Brasil, and additional dances of the Orixás. While at NYU, Powell studied the Argentine peaceful protest movement, Las Madres de La Playa de Mayo, which inspired her to found the activist dance company, Movement of the People Dance Company (MOPDC). Through MOPDC, Powell would develop dance-theatre that unearths the stories of people without "the outlet or privilege to get their work out there."

== Career ==
Though hailed as a "radiant performer", Powell forwent a career directed by others to create socially charged work of her own. Returning to New York, she set about building her company and presenting her choreography at numerous acclaimed venues including, BAAD!, Webster Hall, Bryant Park, chashama, Bronx Museum of the Arts, Summerstage, University Settlement, and Lincoln Center.

In 2016, Powell had her breakthrough with Song And Dance You, which spoke directly about the Black Lives Matter movement. "For her passionate choreographic engagement with issues of justice and race in our communities and our country, for connecting with the audience in ways that make it clear that these concerns belong to all of us—and action is required", Powell was awarded the 2016 Bessie Award for Outstanding Emerging Choreographer. In tandem with her career creating concert dance, Powell has choreographed numerous critically acclaimed plays, including Thomas Bradshaw's Job, Classical Theatre of Harlem's production of Betty Shamieh's Fit For a Queen, Ellen McLaughlin's adaptation of The Trojan Women at The Flea Theater, and Amina Henry's Ducklings at Jack Theatre. Her theatre work is frequently singled-out and lauded for its excellence, particularly in The NYTimes.

Powell has taught as Guest Artist and Lecturer at numerous institutions, including: Pennsylvania State University, Cumbe: Center for African and Diaspora Dance, Gibney Dance, Hobart and William Smith Colleges, Teacher's College, Columbia University, Queens College, Brooklyn College, Kean University, NYU, SUNY Stonybrook, Barnard College, and Movement Research. Currently she teaches at Hunter College and SUNY Old Westbury while continuing to develop new works.

== Personal life ==
Powell is the third of four children. She has two sisters and a brother. Her mother is the tea guru, style aficionado, and model Jo-Ani Johnson.
