= Mariana Valencia =

American multidisciplinary artist

Mariana Valencia (born 1984) is an American contemporary multidisciplinary artist. She was honoured as the "Outstanding Breakout Choreographer" at the 2018 Bessie Awards.

== Early life ==
Valencia is of Guatemalan descent, and was born and raised in Chicago during the 1980s. She received her BA from Hampshire College in Amherst, MA in 2006.

== Career ==
Mariana Valencia was a Whitney Biennial artist (2019) and a Movement Research Global Practice Sharing artist (2016/2017) Her work has been commissioned by the Baryshnikov Arts Center, The Chocolate Factory Theater, The Whitney Museum, and Performance Space New York. She is a founding member of the No Total reading group, and was the co-editor of Movement Research’s Critical Correspondence from 2016-2017. Mariana Valencia published two books, Bouquet and Album in 2019

=== Awards ===
- LMCC Extended Life Grant (2020)
- Bessie Award for Outstanding Breakout Choreographer (2018)
- Jerome Travel and Study Grant (2014-2015)
- The Foundation For Contemporary Arts Award to Artists Grant (2018)

=== Residencies ===
- AUNTS
- Chez Bushwick
- New York Live Arts
- ISSUE Project Room
- Brooklyn Arts Exchange
- Gibney Dance Center
- Movement Research
- Portland Institute for Contemporary Art
- Lower Manhattan Cultural Council
