= Contraband (performance group) =

Contraband, a collection of artists led by director/choreographer Sara Shelton Mann, was a dance-based, live performance ensemble, working together from 1985 to the mid 1990s. Based mainly in San Francisco, the group became known for its lively, electrifying performances, often politically charged and community-engaging. By utilizing dance, music, set, text/spoken word, and site-specific work, Contraband came to develop a cross-disciplinary performance aesthetic, as well as approach to dance and dance training, that would have a profound influence on Bay Area dance, performance art, and culture, as well as performance practice abroad.

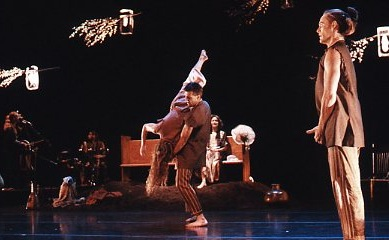
Sara Shelton Mann, Keith Hennessy, and Kim Epifano (upside down) Mira, Cycle I

Emerging with the 1985 work Evol, the group went on to combine contemporary dance with contact improvisation, live music, ritual, activism, innovative set design, and work with experiential states (see essential states), developing a more expressionistic approach to dance and theater on the West Coast. Many members have continued on to further professional careers in art, music, dance, and circus. Members include director Sara Shelton Mann with Lauren Elder, Keith Hennessy (Circo Zero Performance), Jess Curtis (Jess Curtis/Gravity), Norman Rutherford, Rinde Eckert, Kim Epifano (Epiphany Productions), Jules Beckman (libertivore, Collectif AOC), Elaine Buckholtz, Nina Hart, Brenda Munnell, Kathleen Hermesdorf (La Alternativa), Brook Klehm, Julie Kane, Shannon McMurchy (McGuire), and Peter Kadyk. The company dissolved in the mid-1990s due to financial concerns.

== Works ==
Canada

- The Float with Belinda Weitzel, Freddie Long, John LeFan, Ernie Adams, Sara Shelton Mann
- The Child with Byron Brown, Andy Warshaw, Sara Shelton Mann
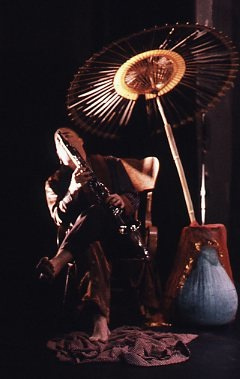
  Norman Rutherford in Mira I Photo by Lauren Elder, 1991

San Francisco

- Evol (1985)
- Religare: Hope of the Impossible (1986) at the Gartland Pit, 16th & Valencia
- The (Invisible) War (1987)
- Mandala (1987)
- Oracle (1988)
- Religare II (1989) at Plaza West housing projects
- Mira Cycle I (1990)
- Mira Cycle II: The Fall
- Mira Cycle III: Return to Ordinary Life

=== Evol ===
Premiered in 1985 at The LAB, in San Francisco. Evol (love spelled backwards) began as a performance research project, developing into a show that attained a cult-like following amongst audience members. Integrating dance with spoken word/text, the performance dealt with issues of gender and identity politics.

=== Religare ===
A site-specific work, developed at the Gartland Pit in the Mission District of San Francisco. Religare mixed installation and live art with dance and music to create a ritualized performance for renewal of a site traumatized by arsonry and neglect. It received unprecedented support from the community, inspiring participation by audience members (in music-making, site maintenance, crowd safety, publicity, as well as a mural). The title Religare comes from the Latin to bind fast or to reconnect, the Latin root for religion. It was restaged at Laney College, and in 1989 as Religare II at the Plaza West Eddy St Projects.

=== The (Invisible) War ===
A piece on gender and relationships, combining contemponary movement duets with experimental theater and songs.

=== Oracle ===
Premiered at Theatre Artaud, SF, in 1988. Featured a set of "junkyard" objects, including electrified barbed wire and a refrigerator swung as if a pendulum, inducing a hypnotic effect to the dancing. This durational, physical quality to the set anticipated further design by Elder, such as the use of melting ice blocks in Mira, Cycle I, where the set moved with, and was as dependent on the laws of physics, as the dancers. Spoken text backgrounded the dancing, lending an idiosyncratic character to each dancer's movements.

=== Mandala ===
Mandala explored themes of masculinity and upbringing; weaving music, movement, ritual, and storytelling together into a pastiche of performance work. Evocative of a personal inner journey, Mandala experimented with a re-imaging of male culture. It was performed by male company members Jess Curtis, Keith Hennessy, and Jules Beckman; directed by Remy Charlip and Sara Shelton Mann.

=== The Mira Cycles ===
Inspired by the 16th Century Hindu poet, Mirabai, The Mira Cycles was a trilogy exploring the mystic and the journey to a higher self. The first, Mira I, took place beneath melting blocks of ice, containing embedded flower branches. Mira II: The Fall worked with the "other", or Mirabai's theme of the "dark one," delving into the unseen part of the psyche. The use of free-flowing water pervaded in Mira III: Return to Ordinary Life.

PRODUCTION INFO
| | EVOL | Religare | The (Invisible) War | Oracle | Mandala | Religare II | Mira, Cycle I | Mira, Cycle II | Mira, Cycle III |
|---|---|---|---|---|---|---|---|---|---|
| Year | 1985 | 1986 | 1987 | 1988 | 1987 | 1989 | 1990 | 1991 | 1993 |
| Direction | Sara Shelton Mann, Asst. Jim Cave | Sara Shelton Mann | Sara Shelton Mann | Sara Shelton Mann | Directorial Assistance: Remy Charlip & Sara Shelton Mann | Sara Shelton Mann | Sara Shelton Mann | Sara Shelton Mann | Sara Shelton Mann |
| Music Composition/Direction | | Gwen Jones, Richard Klein, Norman Rutherford, contribution by Rinde Eckert | Jules Beckman, Rinde Eckert | Jules Beckman, Rinde Eckert | Jules Beckman, Jess Curtis | Gwen Jones, Richard Klein, Norman Rutherford | Norman Rutherford and Jules Beckman | 1st score: Andy Warshaw, 2nd score: Norman Rutherford | Norman Rutherford |
| Design | Lauren Elder (set), Jim Cave & Benji Young (lighting) | Lauren Elder (set), Julian Neff (lighting) | | Lauren Elder (set), John O'Keefe (dramaturgy) | | Lauren Elder (set), Elaine Buckholtz (lighting) | Lauren Elder (set), Jack Carpenter (lighting) | Lauren Elder (set), Jack Carpenter & Elaine Buckholtz (lighting) | |
| Performers/Collaborators | Jess Curtis, A. Dibbs/Sara Shelton Mann, Nina Hart, Keith Hennessy, Brook Klehm | Jess Curtis, Lauren Elder, Gwen Jones, Nina Hart, Keith Hennessy, Richard Klein, Sara Shelton Mann, Brenda Munnell, Norman Rutherford, 20-piece percussion/vocal choir | Jess Curtis, Keith Hennessy, Sara Shelton Mann | Jules Beckman, Jess Curtis, Nina Hart, Keith Hennessy, Brenda Munnell/Kim Epifano | Jules Beckman, Jess Curtis, Keith Hennessy | Jules Beckman, Jess Curtis, Lauren Elder, Kim Epifano, Gwen Jones, Keith Hennessy, Julie Kane, Richard Klein, Sara Shelton Mann, Norman Rutherford, 20-piece percussion/vocal choir | Jules Beckman, Jess Curtis, Kim Epifano, Keith Hennessy, Julie Kane, Sara Shelton Mann, Norman Rutherford, women's chorus | Jules Beckman, Jess Curtis, Kim Epifano, Julie Kane, Keith Hennessy/Peter Kadyk, Sara Shelton Mann, Norman Rutherford | Jules Beckman, David Bentley, Brenton Cheng, Kim Epifano, Kathleen Hermesdorf, Peter Kadyk, Andrew Kushin, Sara Shelton Mann, Albert Mathias, Shannon McMurchy (McGuire), Norman Rutherford |
| First performed at | The Lab, SF | Gartland Pit, 16th St & Valencia, SF | Theatre Artaud, SF | | | Plaza West Housing Projects, Eddy St, SF | | | |

== Collaboration and process ==
Inspired by a fluidity of roles, Contraband often functioned as a collective, guided by Shelton Mann's directorial vision. Though the title was originally used for pieces made in Canada by Mann, the company that came to be known as Contraband did not begin until the 1985 San Francisco group, starting as a research project for Evol. Rehearsals were highly research-based, using contact improv and theatrical experimentation from which to develop material. Collaborators regularly contributed beyond their stated role: the lighting designer sang, the composer acted, and the dancers played music, sang, and acted.

=== Related projects ===
Other projects by Contraband members include Off-Limits, a performance happening directed by Lauren Elder, and subsequently other Contraband members. Assorted collaborations and independent projects between members are Indicative of the group's collective approach to art-making.

== Style and approach ==
Contraband was marked by a voracity of spirit and energy, a sense of attack driven by a desire to reignite the spirit. Mystical, athletic, and innovative, the collective energy left audiences energized. Material often combined social commentary with daring movement and acrobatics, and "live music at once primitive and eccentric." Credited with a melding of forms, Contraband's work traversed worlds "of cross-cultural ritual and contemporary punk", creating ritualized performances of sound, movement, and theater.

=== Common themes ===
- surreal use of everyday props
- folk song
- black dresses
- natural elements in set design
- contact improv/acrobatics
- search for the mystical, the unseen thing
- healing & spiritual reconnection

== Awards and accolades ==
Isadora Duncan Awards (IZZIES):

- 1986: Musical Score to Rinde Eckert, Norman Rutherford, Gwen Jones, & Richard Klein for Religare
- 1987: Set Design to Lauren Elder for Oracle
- 1994: Outstanding Achievement for Company Performance to Contraband for Mira II
- 1994: Choreography to Sara Shelton Mann for Mira II
- 1988 NEA Grant for Interdisciplinary Arts
