= Bailiwick Repertory Theatre =

Theater company in Chicago, USA

The Bailiwick Repertory Theatre was a Lakeview, Chicago theater company founded in 1982 by a group led by managing directors David Zak and David Pearson. Originally envisioned as a "director's theater" focused on directors' visions of rarely-produced classic plays, it soon became known especially for its performances written by and centering on LGBTQ people, particularly gay men. Notable productions included a 1987 production of Animal Farm that won seven Jeff Awards, the 1988 Chicago premiere of Robert Chesley's Jerker, Biello & Martin's 1999 production of Fairytales/Breathe, and the 2007 American premiere of Jerry Springer - The Opera.

After a series of moves across its 26-year history, Bailiwick Repertory Theater moved out of its final venue in 2008 and was officially dissolved in the fall of 2009.

After the Repertory's closure, many of the company's former artists got together to create a new company in order to continue Bailiwick's legacy of producing daring and risky musicals and plays. This new company, called Bailiwick Chicago, launched on November 8, 2009. Bailiwick Chicago produced non-equity musicals and plays, with a special emphasis on cultural, social and sexual diversity. The new company mounted productions at various locations around Chicago until it closed for a "restructuring phase" at the end of 2015, from which it never returned.

== See also ==
- Theater in Chicago
