= The Joshua Light Show =

Liquid light show

The Joshua Light Show, created by Joshua White, was a liquid light show. It was known for its psychedelic art and served as a lighting backdrop behind many live band performances during the late 1960s and early 1970s.

Joshua White studied electrical engineering, theatrical lighting, and magic lantern techniques at Carnegie Tech and also film making at University of Southern California. Performances were held every weekend. The light shows used multiple image-making devices including film projectors, slide projectors, overhead projectors, color wheels, watercolors, oil colors, and glass crystals. These all would be arranged on two levels for their performances. The Joshua Light Show based their shows on four elements; projection of pure color, concrete imagery, variety of color effects and shaping of the light.

The Joshua Light Show has provided visual backgrounds for Janis Joplin, the Grateful Dead, the Who, Jefferson Airplane, the Band, the Doors, Frank Zappa, Lou Reed, Television, Vanilla Fudge and Ravi Shankar among others. The light show appeared on the back cover of Jimi Hendrix's album Band of Gypsies and the front cover of Iron Butterfly's album In-A-Gadda-Da-Vida.

== Members ==
- The Joshua Light Show
- William Schwarzbach
- Thomas Shoesmith
- Lois Zelman
- Cecily Hoyt
