= Jess Curtis/Gravity =

American dance company

Jess Curtis/Gravity is a performance company founded in 2000 by American choreographer Jess Curtis.

== Members ==
=== Jess Curtis ===
Living and working in San Francisco and Berlin, Jess Curtis was a founding member of the '90s collective Contraband, He created a body of work ranging from underground extremes of Mission District warehouses with Contraband (1985–1994) to the formal refinement of European State Theaters with Jess Curtis/Gravity (2000–present). He was a member of experimental French circus project Compagnie Cahin Caha, Cirque Batard (1998–2002) and co-founded the extreme performance collective CORE (SF,1994–1998). Curtis has received three Isadora Duncan dance awards, and was a recipient of the prestigious 2001 California Dancemakers Fellowship. Jess Curtis died unexpectedly on March 11, 2024, of an apparent heart attack while riding his bicycle in San Francisco.

=== Maria Francesca Scaroni ===
Maria Francesca Scaroni is a performer from Italy, living now in Berlin. After dancing in Italian TV productions (Canale 5, Rai 2), she trained and worked with Manuela Bondavalli Danza (1998/2004), a collaboration that rooted her dance practice in Release Technique and Contact Improvisation. She trained independently, studying as a freelancer in Europe and in the United States. She has been collaborating with Jess Curtis/Gravity since 2004 (Berlin/San Francisco) as performer, teacher and choreographer. Since 2006 Scaroni has performed in works by San Francisco choreographer Sara Shelton Mann. In Berlin she works as collaborator/performer with Julia Reinartz, Friederike Plafki and the gallery-based collective Bridge on a Wall. In Berlin she is part of an improvisation-based group instigated by Meg Stuart and Jeremy Wade. She holds a master's degree in Contemporary Literature, with a focus on Media and Communication and a thesis on education and dance.

== About ==
Jess Curtis/Gravity was founded in 2000 as a research and development vehicle for live performance. Gravity created body based art that explores and addresses issues and ideas of substance and relevance to a broad popular public. In addition to the creation of live performances Gravity also produces and facilitates educational experiences for both professionals and lay people in movement and performing arts.

JessCurtis/Gravity has several times been a resident artist at CounterPULSE, where its works "have resembled postmodern cabarets, loosely drawn around a theme." according to Voice of Dance. Under the Radar (2007) was particularly successful in its mix of disparate episodes of physical comedy, rope climbing, singing and juggling; Scaroni, among her other assignments, served as a bartender.

== Controversy Surrounding "The Symmetry Project" ==
In 2009, the company gained attention in the mainstream media due to controversy over the Symmetry Project. Fox News described the piece as "it amounts to two people writhing naked on the floor, a government-funded tango in the altogether.". The article quoted Curtis as responding "I think art is an incredibly important part of our culture and our life and ... that it's very much appropriate that our government should be supporting it."

Although conservative pundits pointed to the Symmetry Project as a representation of wasted taxpayer's money, it received generally favorable reviews from dance critics.

== Works ==
=== Touched ===
Jess Curtis/Gravity’s "Touched: Symptoms of Being Human" explores the literal, cultural, personal, and political ramifications of contact between individuals and among people.

=== Under the Radar ===
"Under the Radar" is a cabaret piece focusing on the issues of visibility, ability and disability and features an international cast of disabled and non-disabled performers. It debuted at the San Francisco CounterPulse space in 2007.

=== The Symmetry Project ===
Symmetry Project has been performed over a dozen times in venues around the world. It is a piece investigating and embodying symmetrical (homologous) movement practice in a series of highly structured improvisational scores and choreographed movement sequences. According to a 2008 press release "In this process Scaroni and Curtis force the dislocation of their physically based work, from a traditional theatrical context, into both gallery and public space contexts."

Renee Renouf of Ballet magazine reviewed Symmetry Project favorably in 2009, remarking "The abstraction managed was extraordinary; even as they met and grasped each other, there was no hint of sexual coupling for all the frontal nature of many of their positions when sexual organs with partly opened legs were exposed front and center. The act of grasping hand to shoulder or hip, the effort of jack-knifing one body so it could be raised or lifted over a supporting one transcended any implication of union or battle of genders." Symmetry Project was also cited as one of 2008's "Ten Best Dances" by Voice of Dance magazine
