= Shana Moulton =

American artist

- Born: July 17, 1976 (age 49); Oakhurst, California
- Known for: Video art
- Notable work: Whispering Pines, The Mountain Where Everything is Upside Down
- Awards: Creative Capital Grant (2013)

Shana Moulton is a New York based media artist who explores contemporary anxieties through her filmic alter ego, Cynthia. Combining an unsettling, wry humor with a low-tech, Pop sensibility, Cynthia's interactions with the everyday world are both mundane and surreal, in a domestic sphere just slightly askew. As her protagonist navigates the enigmatic and possibly magical properties of her home decor, Moulton initiates relationships with objects and consumer products that are at once banal and uncanny.

== Background and education ==
Born in Oakhurst, California, Shana Moulton attended the University of California, Berkeley and continued to receive a MFA from Carnegie Mellon University. She has also studied at the Skowhegan School of Painting and Sculpture and De Ateliers in Amsterdam, Netherlands. Moulton has been an artist in resident at Harvestworks, New York City (2008), and the Lower Manhattan Cultural Council (2011). She has also received fellowships and grants from the Experimental Television Center (2009), the Foundation for Contemporary Arts (2009), and Harvestworks (2010). She currently works in Brooklyn, New York.

== Works ==
=== Whispering Pines ===
The 10-part video series, Whispering Pines follows the protagonist's search for perfect health and peace through consumer objects. Cynthia, Moulton's intimately autobiographical, surreal, video alter-ego, interacts with appropriated new-age marginalia, prescription drugs, and beauty products in scenes that address the difficulties of self-discovery and fulfillment in a modern, consumerism-driven society. Moulton explains that she is not required to 'get into character' for Cynthia; Cynthia is always there. Moulton says of her alter-ego, "It's me in the bathroom; it's me worried about aging; it's me looking at a beauty magazine... We share a brain. I don't even think of her as a character. It's just me." Through Moulton's narrative of self-discovery, Cynthia gains relief from the social pressures of her domestic products by using them in non-prescribed ways. Parts of the Whispering Pines series have been exhibited at the Museum of Fine Arts (St. Petersburg, Florida) and the New Museum. The music and libretto of Whispering Pines 10 (2018) was composed by Nick Hallett.

=== Restless Leg Saga (2012) ===
Restless Leg Saga is a 7:24 minute-long film that follows Cynthia’s search for a cure for her restless leg syndrome. Like her other works, she attempts to find relief through pharmaceutical ads on television and in magazines. Restless Leg Saga was displayed to the public at the International Film Festival Rotterdam in 2013.

=== MindPlace ThoughtStream (2014) ===
MindPlace Thoughtstream is a 12-minute-long film that follows the protagonist’s search for health and confrontation with the social expectations of female health. The video focuses on Cynthia, Moulton’s kitschy alter-ego, who uses an appropriated New Age device to access the inside of her own mind. Cynthia, played by Moulton, deals with several stress-related ailments and searches for a cure through various New Age therapy devices including appropriated objects and pharmaceutical drugs claiming to offer a special cure marketed towards Cynthia’s demographic. MindPlace ThoughtStream has been exhibited at the Museum of Modern Art, Warsaw.

== Exhibitions ==
=== Solo ===
- Smack Mellon, Brooklyn, NY (upcoming)
- Journeys Out of the Body, Museum of Fine Art, St. Petersburg, Florida (June 18 – October 9, 2016)
- Hybrid Naples, Fondazione Morra Greco Naples, Italy (2013)
- A Unique Boutique, Galerie Crèvecœur Paris, France (2013)
- Prevention, Gimpel Fils Gallery, London, England (2012)
- Siła Woli, Galeria Arsenał, Białystok, Poland (2012)
- Restless Leg Saga, Galerie Gregor Staiger at Liste, Basel, Switzerland (2012)
- The line where your appearance flips over into reality, Agape Enterprise, Brooklyn, NY (2012)
- Shana Moulton, Allcott Gallery, University of North Carolina, Chapel Hill, NC (2012)
- Decorations of the Mind II, Galerie Gregor Staiger, Zurich, Switzerland (2011)
- Operaprima: Shana Moulton, white.fish.tank, Ancona, Italy (2011)
- The Castle of Secrets, Galerie Fons Welters, Amsterdam, the Netherlands (2010)
- Puzzle Saga, Gimpel Fils Gallery, London, England (2010)
- Sector Focus, Pianissimo at Art Forum Berlin, Berlin, Germany (2010)
- Whispering Pines 6, 7, 8, The Box at The Wexner Center for the Arts, Cleveland, OH (2010)
- Whispering Pines 4, David Castillo Gallery, Miami, FL (2010)
- The Undiscovered Antique, New Commission 09, Art in General, New York, NY (catalog)
- Whispering Pines by Shana Moulton, Broadcast Gallery, Dublin, Ireland (2009)
- Subjective Projections, Bielefelder Kunstverein, Bielefeld, Germany (2009)
- 4 x 4, The Bluecoat, Liverpool, England (2009)
- Repetitive Stress Injuries, Pianissimo, Milan, Italy (2008)
- Whispering Pines, Contemporary Museum of Art, Uppsala, Sweden (2008)
- Sand Saga, Broadway 1602, New York, NY (2008)
- Whispering Pines, Gimpel Fils Gallery, "London, England" (2007)
- Whispering Pines, Project Room, Bellwether Gallery, New York, NY (2007)
