= Ann Carlson (dancer) =

American dancer (born 1954)

- Born: October 21, 1954 (age 70); Park Ridge, Illinois, U.S.
- Occupation: Dancer

Ann Carlson (born October 21, 1954) is an American dancer, choreographer, and performance artist whose work explores contemporary social issues. She has performed throughout the United States and internationally and has won a number of awards.

== Beginnings in dance ==
Carlson was born in Park Ridge, Illinois. She graduated magna cum laude with a BFA in modern dance from the University of Utah in 1976. In 1983 she became one of the first students of the University of Arizona to earn a graduate degree in dance. Even though Carlson received extensive dance training as a child, she defined dance as "any conscious movement in time and space". Carlson came to this conclusion when she was 12 years old after attending a lecture and demonstration by Murray Louis at the Chicago Museum of Contemporary Art. Because of her broad view of dance, Carlson often tackles important issues in her work and works within a number of disciplines to respond to ideas, concepts and themes. As a result, Carlson takes her work far beyond the confines of traditional "dance" into a realm that could be called performance art.

== Career ==
In the early part of her dance career, from the late 1970s to the early 1990s, Carlson performed with Territory Dance Theater in Tucson, Arizona, and later, when she moved to New York in 1984, performed with Susan Rethorst and Meredith Monk. She was an original member of the PS 122 Field Trip Tours, a group of solo performance artists and choreographers that toured their works throughout the United States in the late 1980s. Ms. Carlson presented her first evening-length work, "Real People", in 1986 at Performance Space 122. That piece became the catalyst for an ongoing group of works that Carlson referred to as the "Real People series", works made with and performed by people gathered together around common professions, activities or shared relationships. This body of work, described as "delegated performance", became the foundation for much of Carlson's later choreography. The work "Sloss, Kerr, Rosenberg & Moore" (or "the lawyer piece") was performed by four (actual) New York attorneys. Carlson's second evening-length work, "Animals", debuted at Dance Theater Workshop in 1988 and toured throughout the U.S. into the mid-1990s. Carlson choreographed the opera "Kabballah" to music composed by Stewart Wallace. Allen Ginsberg and Philip Glass's chamber opera "Hydrogen Jukebox" was staged by Ann Carlson in June 1990. A 2017 work by the artist entitled "Doggie Hamlet," which included "five performers, three herding dogs, a dog handler, a dog trainer and a flock of sheep," was performed in a meadow at dusk.

As a choreographer, Carlson’s work has been performed throughout the United States; some notable places her choreography has been featured include Washington D.C., New York City, Chicago, Houston and Los Angeles. Internationally her work has been performed in West Germany, Prague and Mexico City. From 1990 until 2010 Carlson collaborated with video maker Mary Ellen Strom on a number of performances and performance videos. These videos are held in collections in museums and private collections.

== Awards ==
Carlson’s choreography has earned her a New York Dance and Performance Award in 1988, American Dance Festival Award in 1988, a prestigious three year choreographic award from the National Endowment for the Arts, 1989–1991, the CalArts Alpert Award in Dance in 1995, and the Foundation for Contemporary Arts Grants to Artists Award in 1998, A New York Foundation for the Arts Fellowship in 2000, a Guggenheim Fellowship in 2003, a fellowship from the Radcliffe Institute for Advanced Studies at Harvard University in 2004, a USA Artist Fellowship in 2008, an American Master's Award in 2010, and a Creative Capital Award in 2016.

== Style of work ==
Some critics refer to Carlson’s work as dance-theater and some refer to it as talking dancing. Her work often incorporates different movement components, speaking or acting components, and props or sometimes animals. A piece entitled The Dog Inside the Man Inside represents all these areas of Carlson’s work and is from a series of work called Animals. The setup of this piece includes a straight chair, a television set, a white picket fence, and, most notably, a real live dog. Other animals are later featured, including a goldfish, a cat and a goat. Carlson said she wanted "to make works that could respond to a living being, that I couldn’t choreograph in the way that I’d been taught to choreograph".
