= James Baker (composer) =

American electro-acoustic composer, percussionist and conductor

- Born: United States
- Education: SUNY Purchase; Juilliard School
- Occupations: Composer, percussionist, conductor
- Organizations: New York City Ballet Orchestra (Principal Percussionist); New York New Music Ensemble; Speculum Musicae; University at Buffalo's Center for 21st Century Music (Resident Conductor); Composers' Conference (Music Director); The New School, Mannes College of Music (Percussion Ensemble Director)
- Known for: Electro-acoustic compositions, contemporary music conducting
- Notable work: Heaven Up North, Cover Boy, Wrought Iron Fog, Rammed Earth, Baby, Frozen Mommy
- Awards: Bessie Award for Heaven Up North

James Baker is an American electro-acoustic composer, percussionist and conductor.

== Life and career ==
James Baker graduated with degrees in music from State University of New York at Purchase and Juilliard, where he studied percussion and conducting. He began a long time collaboration with choreographer Tere O'Connor and has composed numerous works for Tere O'Connor Dance, including Bessie Award winner Heaven Up North. He was also the composer for Like Two Kevins for the Lyon Opera Ballet. His works have been performed internationally.

Baker works as Principal Percussionist for the New York City Ballet Orchestra and serves as director of the Percussion Ensemble at the New School, Mannes College of Music. He also serves as music director of the Composers' Conference at Wellesley College. Baker often leads the New York New Music Ensemble and Speculum Musicae, and is resident conductor at the University at Buffalo's Center for 21st Century Music. He also appears as guest conductor with the Cygnus and Talea Ensembles.

Baker appears as director on recordings including the CD, David Felder: Boxman (2002). He appears as percussionist on recordings including Millennial Masters Vol. 1.

== Works ==
Selected works include:

- Cover Boy (2011)
- Wrought Iron Fog (2009)
- Rammed Earth (2007)
- Baby (2006)
- Frozen Mommy (2004)
