= Joe Goode (choreographer) =

American choreographer, director, and writer

Joe Goode (born 1951) is an American choreographer, director, performer, and writer known for creating multidimensional performance works, often about identity and interpersonal relationships in contemporary times.

Goode founded Joe Goode Performance Works in 1986. Goode is "widely known as an innovator in the field of dance for his willingness to collide movement with spoken word, song, and visual imagery."

== Early life and education ==
Joe Goode was born in Oklahoma City, Oklahoma in 1951. He graduated from Virginia Commonwealth University in 1973.

== Career ==
After college, Goode moved to New York to join the Merce Cunningham Dance Company. In 1973, he relocated to San Francisco and joined the Margaret Jenkins Dance Company.

In 1983, he premiered his first independent choreographic work Stanley in San Francisco.

A 1999 review of Gender Heros describes Goode's process, "Joe Goode based 'Gender Heroes Part I' on interviews conducted with Bay Area community members from different cultural and ethnic backgrounds, ranging from elderly persons and first-generation Americans to transgendered [sic] individuals and cross-dressers. This world premiere explores the social and cultural forces that influence gender, and the expectations of men and women in our communities. Through dance and spoken word, the piece uses the collected narratives to offer a glimpse into the personal journey toward one's gender identity."

San Francisco Chronicle Arts and Culture Critic Steven Winn calls Goode's 2008 Wonderboy an, "achingly tender new dance theater piece . . . in one of those passages of innocent joy that Goode can conjure like no one else." He claims, "Goode's work often skates on, and over, the line of preciousness. . ."

Los Angeles Times dance reviewer Lewis Segal writes that Convenience Boy (1993) is "Complex, uneven, often brilliant in its gallows humor..."

Goode was a professor in Theater, Dance and Performance Studies at UC Berkeley for 23 years, retiring in 2024.

In 2025, Goode premiered the immersive theater work Are You Okay? at the Rincon Center in San Francisco. This work received an Izzie award for Outstanding Achievement in Visual Design.

Lily Janiak, the San Francisco Chronicle's theater critic, wrote of the production: "In immersive theater, perennial problems include directing spectators' gaze and making sure everyone can see everything in a space not built with sightlines in mind. Here, Joe Goode Performance Group dispatches those obstacles with the economy and elegance of sound and light (including one handheld LED light that has the feel of putting on a show in an attic), as well as with rolling platforms. They're mini elevated stages, but they're also like boats adrift at sea, emphasizing characters' isolation and need to connect."

== Awards ==
- New York Dance and Performance ("Bessie") Award, 1998
- San Francisco Isadora Duncan ("Izzie") Award, 1998
- Irvine Fellowship in Dance, 1998
- Creative Capital, 2000
- John Simon Guggenheim Fellowship for choreography, 2007
- USA Fellow, 2008
- National Endowment for the Arts
- California Arts Council
- Isadora Duncan (Izzie) Award for Outstanding Achievement in Visual Design, 2026

== Creative work ==
- Stanley, 1983
- 29 Effeminate Gestures, 1987
- The Disaster Series, 1989
- Convenience Boy, 1993
- Maverick Strain, 1996
- Deeply There (Stories of a Neighborhood), 1998
- Gender Heroes, 1999
- Body Familiar, 2003
- Grace, 2004
- Transformations, 2006
- Humansville, 2007
- Wonderboy, 2008
- Traveling Light, 2009
- The Resilience Project
- As We Go, 2023
- Are You Okay?, 2025

== Bibliography ==
- Ramsay Burt. The Male Dancer: Bodies, Spectacle, Sexualities. 2nd edition. London: Routledge, 2007.
- David Gere, "29 Effeminate Gestures: Choreographer Joe Goode and the Heroism of Effeminacy" in Dancing Desires: Choreographing Sexualities on and off the Stage, Ed. Jane C. Desmond. Madison: University of Wisconsin Press, 2001.
- Selby Schwartz, "The Silent E: 29 Effeminate Gestures, 24 Years Later," April 1, 2011, published in DANCE.
