= Jen Shyu =

American jazz vocalist and composer (born 1978)

Jen Shyu 徐秋雁
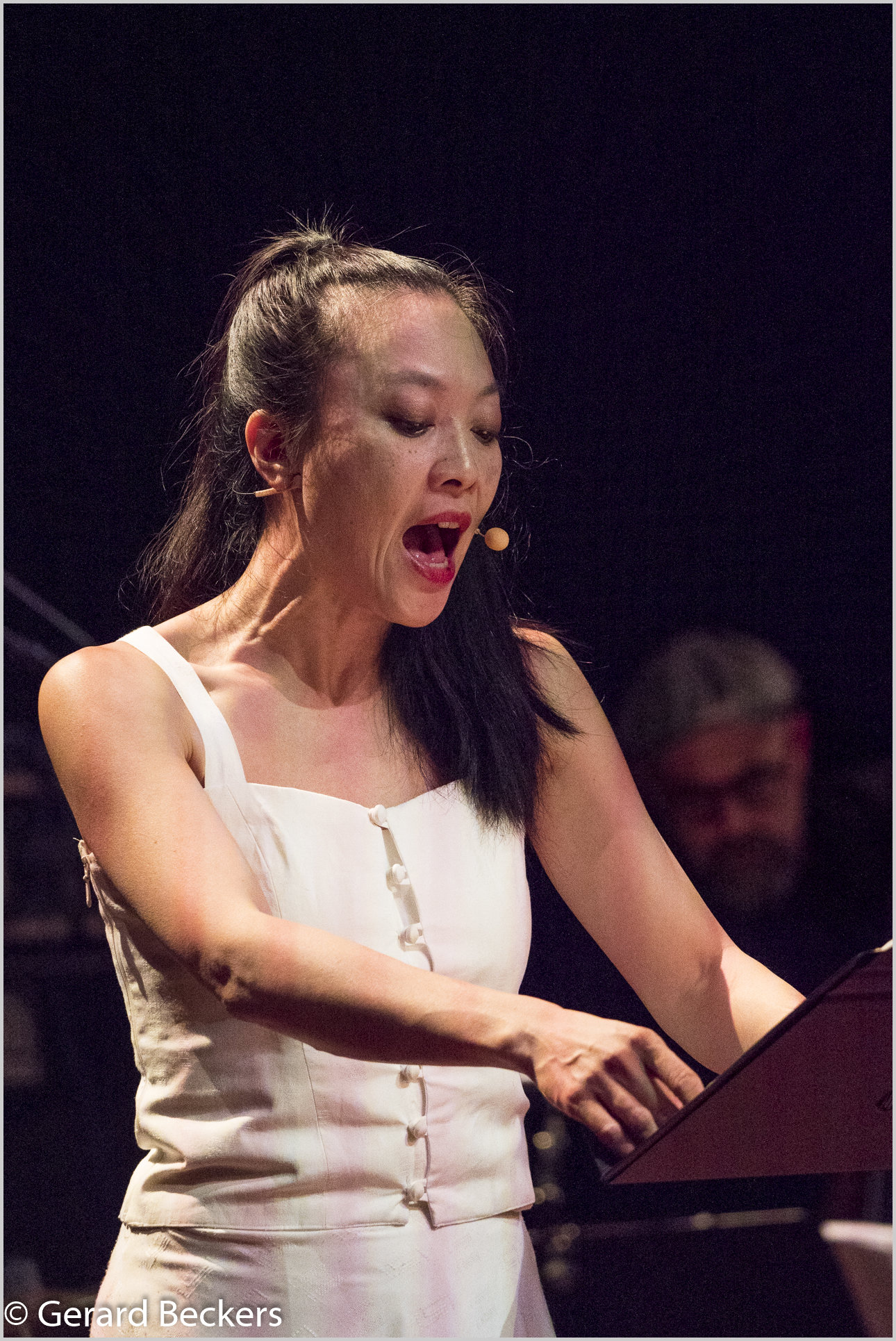
- Performing world premiere of Song of Silver Geese at Roulette. March 2016

Background information
- Born: March 28, 1978 (age 48); Peoria, Illinois
- Years active: 2001–present
- Label: Pi Recordings
- Website: www.jenshyu.com

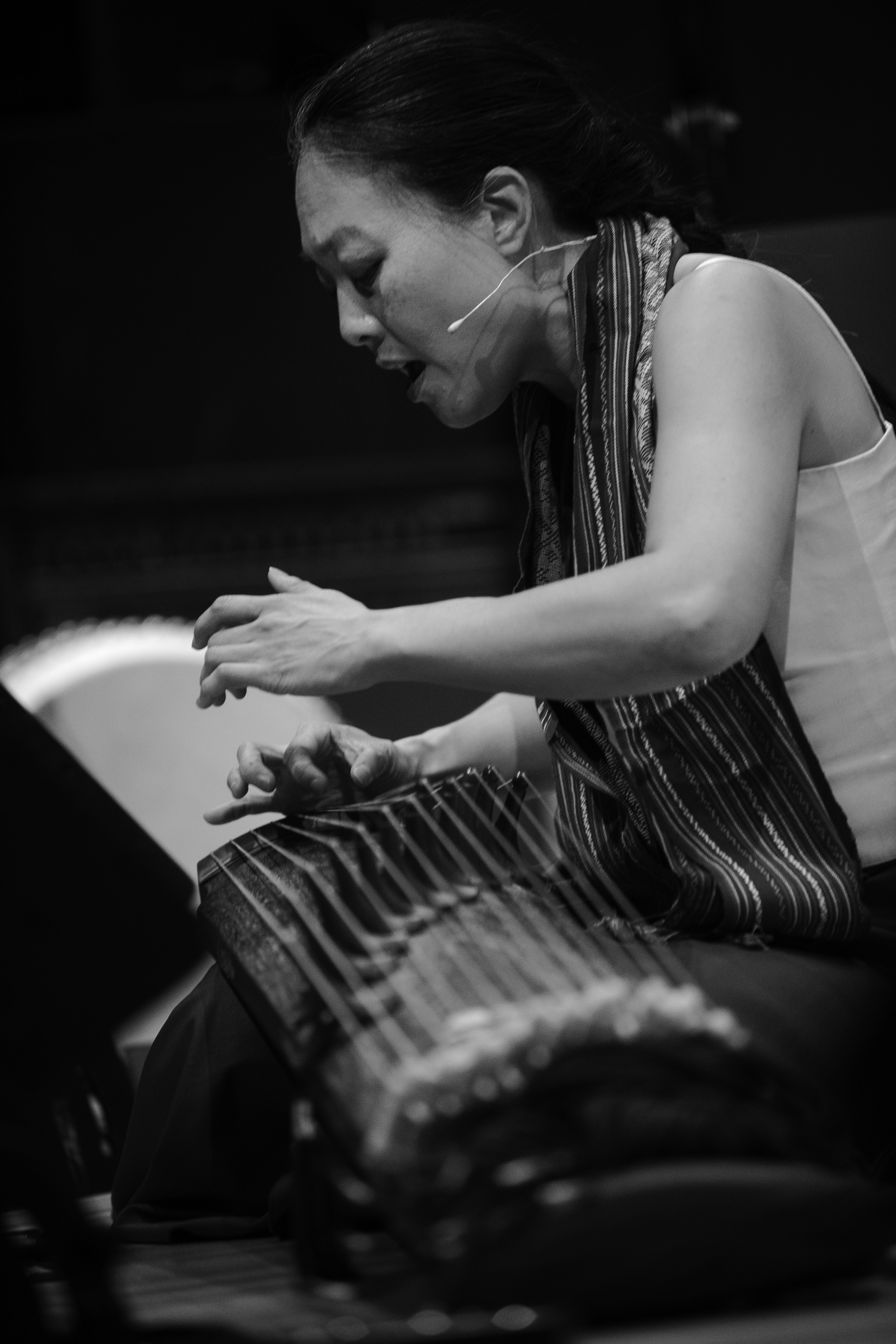
Jen Shyu, Arts for Art - Vision Festival 2024. Photo by Marek Lazarski

Jen Shyu (Chinese: 徐秋雁; pinyin: Xú Qiūyàn; born March 28, 1978) is an American experimental jazz vocalist, composer, multi-instrumentalist, dancer, and producer.

== Early life and education ==
Shyu was born on March 28, 1978, in Peoria, Illinois, the child of Taiwanese and East Timorese immigrants. She was classically trained in piano, violin, and ballet, and performed with the Peoria Symphony Orchestra at the age of 13. Shyu studied theater and opera at Stanford University.

== Career ==
Shyu's seven albums as leader or co-leader include 2011's Synastry, the first woman-led record released by Pi Recordings, and Sounds and Cries of the World (Pi 2015), reviewed favorably by The New York Times and The Wall Street Journal and included in annual best-of lists in both The New York Times and The Nation. The latter album featured Shyu's band Jade Tongue, comprising trumpeter Ambrose Akinmusire, violist Mat Maneri, bassist Thomas Morgan, and drummer Dan Weiss.

Shyu appears on several records released by saxophonist and MacArthur Genius Fellow Steve Coleman and Five Elements. Other collaborators include Anthony Braxton, Mark Dresser, Bobby Previte, Chris Potter, Michael Formanek, and David Binney. Shyu has performed at Carnegie Hall, Lincoln Center, Brooklyn Academy of Music, Metropolitan Museum of Art, Rubin Museum of Art, Ringling International Arts Festival, Asia Society, Roulette, Blue Note Jazz Club, Bimhuis, Salihara Theater, National Gugak Center, and the National Theater of Korea.

Shyu studied traditional music and dance in Cuba, Taiwan, Brazil, China, South Korea, and East Timor. In 2013, Shyu was awarded an Asian Cultural Council Fellowship to conduct music research in Indonesia; this work culminated in 2014's Solo Rites: Seven Breaths, directed by Garin Nugroho. In March 2016, Shyu premiered the multilingual music drama Song of Silver Geese. A duo with MacArthur Genius Fellow Tyshawn Sorey was included in The New York Times as one of the "Best Live Jazz Performances of 2017".

== Recognition ==
Shyu has been a recipient of multiple Doris Duke Performing Artist Awards and Bronx Recognizes Its Own (BRIO) Awards. Commissions have come from the MAP Fund, Jerome Foundation, Chamber Music America’s New Jazz Works, and New Music USA, and Shyu has received fellowships from the Asian Cultural Council, Korean Ministry of Foreign Affairs, and Korean Ministry of Culture, Sports and Tourism. In 2019, she was awarded the Guggenheim Fellowship for Music Composition. In 2024 Shyu was awarded the Rome Prize in Musical Composition at the American Academy in Rome.

== Discography ==
- For Now (2002)
- Jade Tongue (2008)
- Synastry (2011) with Mark Dresser
- Sounds and Cries of the World (2015) with Jade Tongue (Ambrose Akinmusire, Mat Maneri, Thomas Morgan, Dan Weiss)
- Song of Silver Geese (2017)

=== Appearances ===
- Soko Arts Festival 2001 (2001)
- Lewis Jordan Quartet – More Travels of a Zen Baptist (2002)
- Doug Yokoyama Quartet – Thanks for Stopping By (2002)
- Steve Coleman and Five Elements – Lucidarium (2005)
- Steve Coleman and Five Elements – Weaving Symbolics (2006)
- Miles Okazaki – Generations (2009)
- Positive Catastrophe – Garabatos Volume One (2009)
- Steve Coleman and Five Elements – Harvesting Semblances and Affinities (2010)
- Steve Coleman and Five Elements - The Mancy of Sound (2011)
- Aya Nishina – Flora (2013)
- Dan Weiss – Sixteen: Drummers Suite (2016)
