= Jim Hubbard =

New Zealand cartoonist

Jim Hubbard (born 1949) is a New Zealand cartoonist. He joined the Daily Telegraph (Napier, New Zealand) in 1985. His work has appeared in a number of New Zealand newspapers, including the Dominion Post, Bay of Plenty Times, the Southland Times, the Daily Telegraph (Napier), the Northern Advocate and the Otago Daily Times. He won the New Zealand Cartoonist of the Year in 2011 at the Canon Media Awards.

Along with Garrick Tremain, Eric Heath and Burton Silver, he designed a stamp for New Zealand Post in 1997.

Hubbard worked as a freelance cartoonist for Stuff until 2026 when he lost his job.
