= Tere O'Connor =

- Born: 1958 (age 67–68); Rochester, New York
- Occupations: Dancer, choreographer
- Years active: 1979 - present

Tere O'Connor (born 1958) is an American dancer, choreographer and educator. He serves as the artistic director of Tere O'Connor Dance and the Center for Advanced Studies Professor at the University of Illinois at Urbana-Champaign.

== Life and career ==
Tere O'Connor was born in Rochester, New York, and graduated in 1980 with a B.A. from State University of New York at Purchase. He performed in the companies of Rosalind Newman and Matthew Diamond, and began working as a choreographer in 1982. He regularly collaborates with composer James Baker in works for the Tere O'Connor Dance company. O'Connor's works have been performed internationally and his works have been commissioned for dance companies such as the Lyon Opera Ballet, White Oak Dance Project, and de Rotterdamse Dansgroep. Notable dancers and choreographers including Lucy Guerin have danced with his company.

From 1990 to 1999, O'Connor was an instructor in dance at Tisch School of the Arts, New York University, and he became a professor at the University of Illinois Urbana-Champaign. He also teaches at Movement Research in New York City. Since 1989 he has been a member of the Artists Advisory Board of Danspace Project at St. Mark's Church in New York City.

== Honors and awards ==
- 2014 American Academy of Arts & Sciences
- 2013 Doris Duke Artist Award
- 2009 Creative Capital Award
- 2006 New York Foundation for the Arts BUILD Grant
- 2003, 2005, and 2006 Rockefeller Foundation Multi Arts Production Grant
- 2005 New York Dance and Performance Award (Bessie Award) for 'Frozen Mommy'
- 2001 Foundation for Contemporary Arts Grants to Artists Award
- National Endowment for the Arts Fellowships in Choreography
- New York Foundation for the Arts Fellowships in Choreography
- 1999 New York Dance and Performance Award (Bessie Award) for 'Sustained Achievement/Hi Everybody'
- 1993 Guggenheim Memorial Foundation Fellowship
- 1988 New York Dance and Performance Award (Bessie Award) for 'Heaven Up North'

== Works ==
Selected works include:

- 2001 Choke
- 1999 Hi Everybody!
- 1998 The World Is a Missing Girl
- 1998 House
- 1996 Mother
- 1995 Greta in the Ditch
- 1994 The Death of Generous Henry
- 1988 Heaven up North
