= Bebe Miller =

American choreographer, dancer, and director

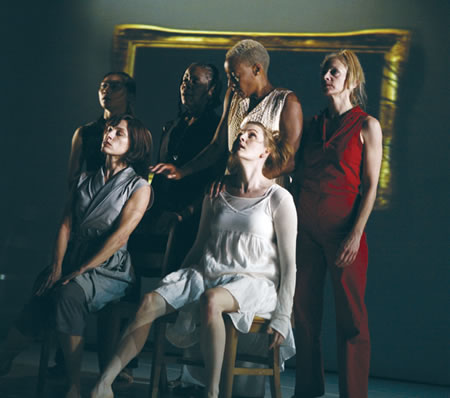
Six women of all ages dance in Bebe Miller's Necessary Beauty at the Wexner Center for the Arts on October 1, 2008: Yen-Fang Yu, Bebe Miller, Cynthia Oliver, and Kathleen Hermesdorf, standing; and Kristina Isabelle and Angie Hauser, sitting.

Bebe Miller (born 1950) is an American choreographer, dancer, and director.

== Career ==
Miller was born in 1950 in Brooklyn, New York. Following her graduation from Ohio State University with a degree in dance, Miller danced in the troupe of Nina Wiener for six years. She formed her own company, Bebe Miller Dance, in 1984. Miller was a professor of dance at the Ohio State University from 2000 to 2017, holding the rank of Distinguished Professor in the Arts and Humanities when she retired. Miller was awarded with an Honorary Doctorate of Humane Letters from Ursinus College in 2009.

== Awards ==
- Creative Artists Public Service Fellowship, 1984, for choreography;
- New York Foundation for the Arts Choreographer's Fellowship, 1984 and 1991;
- National Endowment for the Arts Choreographer's Fellowship, 1985, 1986, 1987, and 1988;
- New York Dance and Performance Award ("Bessie") for choreography, 1986, and 1987;
- American Choreographer Award and John Simon Guggenheim Memorial Fellowship, both 1988;
- Dewar's Young Artists Recognition Award, 1990.

Miller received a 2006 Creative Capital Award in the discipline of Performing Arts. In 2010 she was named a Fellow by United States Artists. In 2012, Miller was awarded a Doris Duke Artist award.

== Works ==
- (1982) Vespers
- (1989) Rain
- (1991) The Hendrix Project
- (1994) Tiny Sisters
- (1995) Tiny Sisters in the Enormous Land
- (1996) Blessed
- (1998) Going to the Wall
- (1999) Rhythm Studies
- (2001) Verge
- (2005) Landing/Place
- (2008) Necessary Beauty
- (2012) A History
- (2017) In a Rhythm
- (2022) Tether
- (2025) Vespers, Reimagined

== Other sources ==
- Attitude, January–April 1987.
- Carman, Joseph. "Bebe Miller Company" Dance Magazine 16 Nob 1999. Print.
- Dance Magazine, May 1986; December 1989.
- Dance Theatre Journal, Spring 1987.
- High Performance, Fall 1991.
- Los Angeles Times, February 13, 1989; January 21, 1990; January 29, 1990; April 20, 1991.
- Miller, Bebe Wilson Web 1999. The HW Wilson Web Company. Print.
- New Yorker, February 20, 1989.
- New York Times, November 30, 1989; May 26, 1991.
- On the Next Wave, Brooklyn Academy of Music, October 1989.
- San Francisco Chronicle, April 26, 1991.
- 7 Days, December 13, 1989.
- Washington Post, March 10, 1989.
