= Keith Hennessy =

Canadian-American dancer

- Born: 1959 (age 66–67)
- Known for: Dancer and choreographer
- Movement: Contemporary dance and Performance art

Keith Hennessy (born 1959 in Sudbury, Ontario, Canada) is a San Francisco-based dancer, choreographer, and performance artist regarded as a pioneer of queer and AIDS-themed performance. He is known for non-linear performance collages that combine dance, speaking, singing, and physical and visual imagery, and for improvised performances that often undermine the performer-observer barrier. Hennessy directs CIRCO ZERO, which has received commissions from Les Subsistances (Lyon) & Les Laboratoires (Paris), FUSED (France-US Exchange), as well as funds from the Zellerbach Family Fund, San Francisco Arts Commission, California Arts Council, Grants for the Arts, and The San Francisco Foundation. In 1982, he hitchhiked to California for a juggling convention, and stayed. In his San Francisco living room he co-founded the grassroots performance space "848 Community Space," which later became CounterPULSE. He was influenced by and has worked with Lucas Hoving, Gulko, Ishmael Houston-Jones and Patrick Scully, Terry Sendgraff, Karen Finley, Joseph Kramer, the collective CORE (Jess Curtis, Stanya Kahn, Jules Beckman, Stephanie Maher, Hennessy), and Contraband, a company directed by Sara Shelton Mann. His work also developed from his participation in social and political activism inspired by Direct Action to Stop the War, Critical Resistance, ACT UP and Queer Nation. In San Francisco Hennessy's work has been presented at numerous venues including Dance Mission, Theater Artaud, Mama Calizo's Voice Factory and Yerba Buena Center for the Arts.

Hennessy is also known for his ability to fuse performance art with community organizing and activism. In one early San Francisco work, Religare, by Contraband, he danced in the dirt in the ruins of a Mission district single-room-occupancy building that was burned down by the owner/landlord. As critic Paul Parish explained, "[I]t was an exorcism and a funeral for the winos who died there, and a healing for the neighborhood, and is perhaps the single greatest dance experience I've ever had."

== Selected works ==
- Religare: Created and performed by Contraband, directed by Sara Shelton Mann, performed in the vacant sunken lot on the Northeast corner of 16th and Valencia Streets in the San Francisco Mission District, the site of a landlord arson that resulted in several deaths.
- Saliva (1988–89): A performance and a sacralizing ceremony of bodily fluids by Keith Hennessy with Jeffrey Alphonsus Mooney, staged under a freeway South of Market in San Francisco. Keith Hennessy created SALIVA, an interdisciplinary dance-performance-ritual under a freeway in downtown San Francisco. Deep within the rage and grief of the AIDS crisis, Hennessy performed a ritualistic reclamation of the body, the queer male body, as holy. SALIVA was also presented at Highways in LA, was featured in the national gay magazine The Advocate (1990), and has since inspired chapters in two academic books: Gay Ideas by Richard Mohr (1992) and How To Make Dances in an Epidemic, the landmark study of AIDS and dance by David Gere (2004).
- How To Die (2005–06)is a diptych of American despair. Act I: Homeless USA. Act II: American Tweaker. The full work has been performed at Les Subsistances (Lyon, 2006) and Dance Mission (San Francisco, 2007, 2010). In France the work is titled Comment Mourir.
- Homeless USA (2005): Performance by Keith Hennessy in collaboration with Jules Beckman. Based on Severance a text by Pulitzer-prize winner Robert Olen Butler. The text imagines the final words spoken by the severed head of a homeless man, after committing suicide by train decapitation. Homeless USA was commissioned by Les Subsistances (Lyon). In France the work is titled SDF USA. SDF means sans domicile fixe (without a fixed address).
- American Tweaker (2006): Performance by Keith Hennessy in collaboration with Jules Beckman and Seth Eisen with additional texts by Kirk Read and the music of Sylvester. Based on a sensationalized media account of a man whose sex and drug binge resulted in a "Super HIV" resistant to all known medications.
- Sol Niger (2008): "Sol Niger" (Black Sun), is a multi-disciplinary piece from Circo Zero, an intimate, spectacular, alchemical, activist circus. The piece addresses current experience, political, social, mystical, through the primary metaphor of a total solar eclipse. Featuring Brett Womack, Emily Leap, Max, Sean Feit, Seth Eisen, Keith Hennessy.
- Delinquent (2008)
- Crotch (all the Joseph Beuys references in the world cannot heal the pain, confusion, regret, cruelty, betrayal, or trauma...) (2008): Hennessy invites the audience to wander around the performing area, a quasi-Beuys environment, listening to Emmylou Harris recordings while examining the objects: items such as lemons with nightlights plugged into them (a reference to Beuys's Capri Batterie), a suspended stuffed bear wearing a prison hood and being whipped by Hennessy, a chair, a toy rabbit, three rectangles of pink fabric, and so forth. The writing on one cloth announces in German that, "The silence of Marcel Duchamp is overrated" (an anti-Dada statement that Beuys made over the radio in 1946). Hennessy covers his object-strewn playground with big, clunky hops and leaps. He tries to rise from a sitting position, but his legs have other ideas. He does these things wearing a hooded black mask with a white outline of Edvard Munch's famous painting, The Scream, as its face. He gives audience members control (from their seats) of three cords that cause a plastic sheet to rise from the floor. Talking a mile a minute and writing on the sheet as it ascends, Hennessy offers a charmingly manic, chaotically erudite survey of German philosophy and art history that might trace routes to Beuys. Somehow Judith Butler's name ends up above the Romantics, and Schelling leads us to contact improvisation via Isadora. Circuitous lines and arrows remake genealogy. he follows this hilarious, bravura performance by helping a stagehand dismantle the sheet and then nailing the two boards from which it hung into a cruciform shape. Balancing this on his head, he walks calmly and carefully along a diagonal path, wavering slightly. A tender, sleepy rendition (on tape) of "Wake up in New York" accompanies him, and as he walks, Hennessy begins to sob. In the last scene, Hennessy removes his emerald green jockey shorts, sits in a chair, and with handfuls of lard (a favorite Beuys material) builds a wall in front of his genitals, slavering the stuff onto his thighs and pressing it to stick. Thus fortified, he asks for three volunteers to sit on chairs placed close to him in a semicircle and invites the rest of the audience to cluster around. As a volunteer holds a spool of red thread, Hennessy takes the needle end and begins slowly to sew through the clothing of all three, a stitch through the knee of one person's jeans, another's skirt. Long red lines begin to connect them to him, because he's passing the needle through his own skin. He cuts the threads, the stage manager drapes him in a blanket, and he stuffs a prizefighter's mouthpiece behind his lower lip.

== Awards ==
Awards include a Guggenheim Fellowship (2017), the Sui Generis Award (2017), a United States Artist Kjenner Fellowship (2012), a Bessie (2009 New York Dance & Performance Award), two Isadora Duncan Awards (2009) for Sol Niger, a Goldie (2007) and the Alpert/MacDowell Fellowship in Dance (2005). In 2009, Hennessy was awarded residencies at the MacDowell Colony, Yaddo, and Djerassi. Recent commissions include Arsenic, Lausanne (Crotch, 2008), Centre Chorégraphique National, Belfort (Sol Niger, 2007), Les Subsistances, Lyon (Sol Niger 2007, Homeless USA, 2005), Les Laboratoires, Paris (American Tweaker, 2006), FUSED (French-US Exchange in Dance), and Lower Left Performance Co, San Diego (Gather, 2005). Hennessy's 2008-09 teaching includes the University of San Francisco; University of California, Davis; Zipfest/Italy; imPulsTanz/Vienna; TSEH/Moscow; Circuit Est/Montreal; and IDA/Toronto. In 2012 Hennessy was named a Fellow by United States Artists. .

== See also ==
- Performance art
- Conceptual Art
