= Bessie Awards =

Award for contemporary dance

The New York Dance and Performance Awards, also known as the Bessie Awards, are awarded annually for exceptional achievement by independent dance artists presenting their work in New York City. The broad categories of the awards are: choreography, performance, music composition and visual design. The Bessie Awards were established in 1983.

== History and description ==
The Bessie Awards were established in 1983 by Dance Theater Workshop and named in honor of Bessie Schonberg, an influential mid-20th-century teacher of modern dance and former head of the dance department at Sarah Lawrence College. The awards honor exceptional choreography, performance, music composition and visual design in dance and allied art forms. Nominees and award winners are chosen by the Bessie Selection Committee, which consists of dancers, dance presenters, producers, choreographers, journalists, critics and academics.

Since 2010, the awards have been overseen by an independent steering committee in partnership with Dance/NYC and administered by Lucy Sexton. In their current iteration, the awards encompass a broader range of dance genres and supporting art forms than in the past, and offer an annual commission to an emerging artist.

== Recipients ==
Over 400 Bessie Awards have been presented since their founding. Notable recipients include:

Choreographers

- Arthur Aviles
- LaTasha Barnes
- Jérôme Bel
- Beverly Schmidt Blossom
- Camille A. Brown
- Trisha Brown
- Donald Byrd
- Ann Carlson
- Ping Chong
- Yoshiko Chuma
- Leslie Cuyjet
- Garth Fagan
- Molissa Fenley
- William Forsythe
- Beth Gill
- Guillermo Gómez-Peña
- Joe Goode
- David Gordon
- Bill Irwin
- Bill T. Jones
- Lisa Jones
- Carl Hancock Rux
- Anne Teresa de Keersmaeker
- Alonzo King
- Stephan Koplowitz
- Édouard Lock
- Meredith Monk
- Mark Morris
- Tere O'Connor
- Tom Pearson
- Stephen Petronio
- Inbal Pinto
- Joya Powell
- Angelin Preljocaj
- David Roussève
- Pam Tanowitz
- Raúl Tamez
- Saburo Teshigawara
- Muna Tseng
- Doug Varone
- Johanna Boyce
- Jawole Willa Jo Zollar
- Robert Wilson
- Christopher Williams
- Mariana Valencia
- Wim Vandekeybus

Composers

- David Byrne
- James Baker
- Anthony Davis
- Peter Laurence Gordon
- Julius Hemphill
- Lenny Pickett
- Dan Siegler
- Hahn Rowe
- David Van Tieghem

Designers

- Charles Atlas
- Powers Boothe
- Kyle Chepulis
- Beverly Emmons
- David Ferri
- Kathryn Kaufmann
- Peter Ksander
- Mark Lancaster
- Mimi Lien
- Susanne Poulin
- Stan Pressner
- Philip Sandström
- Howard S. Thies
- Jennifer Tipton
- Philip Trevino
- Casper Stracke & Benton C Bainbridge

An archive of past recipients is available at the Bessies web site.
