= Video Gallery SCAN =

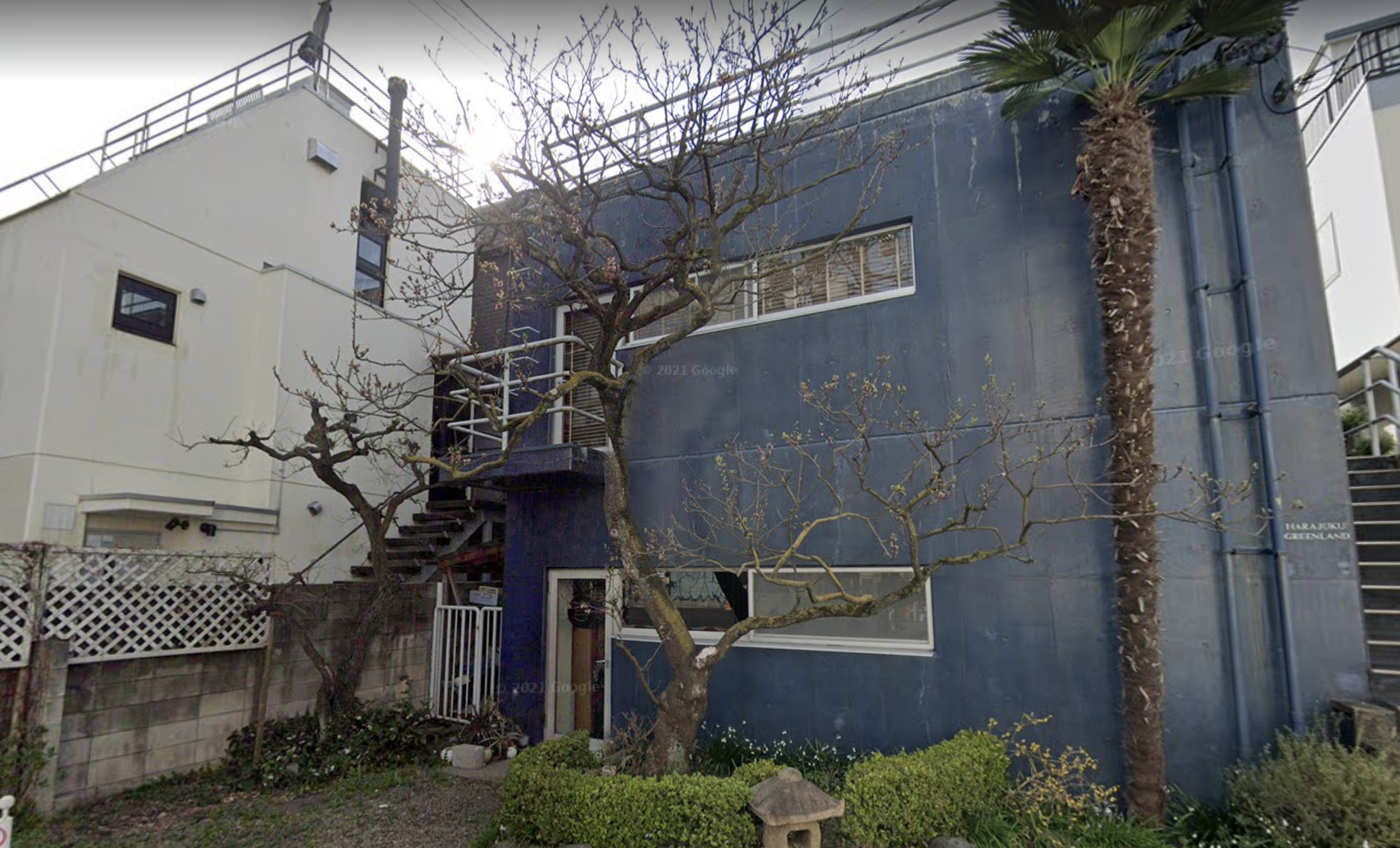
- Greenland Harajuku in 2021
- Established: 1980
- Dissolved: 1992
- Location: Harajuku Greenland, 1 Chome-21-1 Jingumae, Shibuya City, Tokyo, Japan
- Type: Video art gallery
- Owner: Fujiko Nakaya
- Website: www.processart.jp?mode=about

Video Gallery SCAN was the first Japanese art gallery exclusively dedicated to the exhibition, preservation, and promotion of video art. Founded in 1980 by the female performance artist and fog sculptor Fujiko Nakaya, SCAN was an independent, artist-run organization situated in Tokyo's Harajuku neighborhood. While small in scale, the Gallery was a multifunctional space whose services included a video distribution service, video archive & library, screening studio, and exhibition area.

As SCAN's founder and curator, Nakaya was among a number of artists who regularly featured her video art in solo exhibitions.

According to the Gallery curator Keiko Sei, SCAN's mission was to "[raise] the status of video art into the realm of art, television, and film". Video Gallery SCAN's foundation coincided with the maturation of video technology in the 1980s and critic Akira Asada's introduction of postmodernism to Japan. Consequently, these shifts in contemporary art compelled SCAN to equate video art's technical and aesthetic qualities as a viable fine arts medium to the artistic merits of film and television.

Since Tokyo museums, galleries, and universities did not exhibit video art nor possessed any videoworks in their collections, SCAN marketed itself as a center that could promote video artists within Japan and from abroad. During its twelve-year run, the Gallery exhibited a diversity of artists from across the nation, the United States, Europe, and Australia. To expand their reach and secure additional funding, SCAN later organized several video festivals, multimedia events, and exhibitions with affiliate institutions.

== Origins (1966 - 1979) ==
Nakaya's artistic career of the preceding decades influenced her decision to launch a gallery that focused on the quickly burgeoning video art medium.

In 1966, Nakaya joined the Experiments in Art and Technology (E.A.T.), a collective that encouraged creative collaborations between visual artists and engineers. Nakaya's involvement in the collective exposed her to the fusion of newly developed video technologies into artistic projects.

As video art started to gain momentum in Japan's avant-garde communities, Nakaya became a founding member of the collective Video Hiroba from 1972 through the mid-1970s. Video Hiroba's objective followed a different path from E.A.T. as members were more interested in the exploration of video technology's capacity to serve as a tool for public communication rather than purely artistic functions. The production of alternative media inspired Nakaya to utilize video as a form of observation.

In conjunction with her involvement in Video Hiroba, Nakaya furthered her interest in video art after she read Michael Schamberg's seminal 1971 text Guerilla Television. Schamberg criticized broadcast television and advocated for alternative video. She agreed with Schamberg's stance on video art's legitimacy, and she soon published a Japanese translation of his book in 1974. Today, Nakaya and other Japanese artists hail the text as “the bible” of video art. Art historians surmise that Guerilla Television's support for video art networks was one of the underlying motivations for Nakaya's decision to open Video Gallery SCAN.

However, Nakaya's work was not solely focused on video art; she frequently merged video art with other mediums and partnered with individuals from disparate creative disciplines. In 1980, Nakaya incorporated her signature fog sculptures into the visual designs for Trisha Brown's choreographed Opal Loop/Cloud Installation. That same year, the American video artist Bill Viola collaborated with Nakaya for her fog sculpture KAWAJI at the Festival of Light, Sound, and Fog in Kawaji-Onsen, Tochigi.

== Video Gallery SCAN (1980 - 1992) ==
By the late-1970s and early-1980s, the majority of museums, galleries, and universities in Tokyo did not exhibit any form of video art. The lack of financial support for contemporary art - especially video and mediaworks - was a systemic issue that further compounded the invisibility of video art in Japan.

In 1980, Nakaya used her own money to purchase a gallery in Tokyo's bustling Harajuku neighborhood. Video Gallery SCAN was located on the ground floor of a building called the Greenland Harajuku, and it was also where Nakaya lived and worked. The gallery space itself was a small, one-room area whose dimensions were an estimated 60 m^{2} (650 sq ft).

SCAN's name was conceived by the video artist and Nakaya's close friend Bill Viola, who remarked that the title evokes the appearance of scan lines on video monitors, and it reinforced the Gallery's focus on video and media artworks. Subsequently, Bill Viola: Selected Work 1976 - 1980 (April 1980 - October 1980) became one of the first solo exhibitions held at SCAN.

In addition to its unique status as the only arts institution in Japan to exhibit video art, SCAN was an entirely female-run organization. Nakaya worked at the Gallery in both artistic and curatorial roles, and she recruited two female curators throughout SCAN's tenure. Keiko Sei, a curator and media activist, was employed at SCAN from 1983 to 1987 and later left for Eastern Europe to study how video artists employed independent creative expression in Communist-controlled centers. Keiko Tamaki, a musicologist, took over Sei's position in 1988 and remained with the Gallery until its 1992 closure.

While SCAN's operations existed for a little over a decade, it reinvigorated the Japanese video art movement and stimulated a domestic and international video art network that launched the careers of young video and media artists, and connected them to a roster of world-renowned multidisciplinary creatives.

However, the blossoming of digital art and technology in the early-1990s led to a surge in museum and gallery exhibitions that rivaled the activities of SCAN and contributed to its closure in 1992.

== Success ==
The reasons behind SCAN's success and long-standing influence in global contemporary art are multifold.

At the time of SCAN's establishment, Nakaya was 47 years old and already a well-known figure in Japan's art community. Consequently, her involvement in Japanese and American art extended as far back as the mid-to-late 1950s, which led to productive professional relationships with prominent artists (Robert Rauschenberg, Bill Viola, Hakudo Kobayashi), institutions (Electronic Arts Intermix and Museum of Modern Art, New York), and collectives (E.A.T. and Video Hiroba).

Nakaya combined her artistic/curatorial vision with strategic marketing. She utilized Video Gallery SCAN to function as a nexus to connect the Japanese video art scene with video artists abroad in major contemporary art centers in the United States, Canada, Europe, and Australia. She procured multiple international artists to participate in SCAN's exhibitions and included their works in the Gallery's video library, such as the Australian Peter Callas and the American Gary Hill (whose association with SCAN coincided with his involvement in a Japan-U.S. Artists Exchange Fellowship).

SCAN's ties with the Australian video art scene was particularly fruitful as the late-1970s and early-1980s witnessed a strengthening of cultural ties between Japan and Australia. The Japan-Australia Art and Cultural Exchange Committee increased public exposure of artists from both countries through exhibitions in partnership with local gallery owners. SCAN participated in this venture and organized their groundbreaking Continuum '83, Australian Artists in Japan (1983) in which 7 Australian artists exhibited their video and mediaworks; Peter Callas, one of SCAN's exhibitors and the show's curator, later served as a juror for SCAN's future video festivals. Given the daily foot traffic in Harajuku, the exhibition proved to be immensely popular and it was the first major exhibition of Contemporary Australian art in Japan.

For the majority of the 1980s, Video Gallery SCAN maintained its status as the first and only institution in Japan - out of any museum and gallery - to exhibit video art. The Western art world noticed SCAN and began to highlight its originality in art media and publications; Barbara J. London, an American curator and media/sound art specialist was especially impressed with the role SCAN played in the development and refinement of Japanese video art.

== Programming ==
SCAN's programming was not limited to only the exhibition of video and media art. It also offered multiple services that aimed to preserve video art, educate the public on its significance, and allow video artists to edit and create their works.

=== Exhibition gallery space ===
Video Gallery SCAN exhibited video and media works by both Japanese and international artists. There were two types of exhibitions held each year, FOCUS and SCAN Open. FOCUS exhibitions averaged two to four shows a year from 1980 to 1988. These typically featured works by well-known artists from Japan and abroad. The SCAN Open shows were open call exhibitions that occurred one to two times per year from 1980 to 1992 and were specifically designed to attract newcomer video artists from all over Japan.

Unlike other art galleries, visitors had to pay a fee to view the videos for individual exhibitions. For several years, this was the principal source of income for SCAN. This type of admission policy is more closely aligned with that of the standard art museum than a commercial gallery.

=== Video Distribution and Tape Library ===
SCAN stored hundreds of videotapes from Japanese and international video artists. As a dual video art store and lending library, videos were regularly sold and rented to Japanese museums, galleries, and universities. Since video art was not yet considered an integral component of contemporary art nor was it afforded sufficient scholarly attention, the Tape Library helped to archive video art's historical development and current trends. This aspect of SCAN was completed in collaboration with the video and media art non-profit Electronic Arts Intermix.

=== Editing room ===
Video artists were permitted to utilize SCAN's available video recording and other technological equipment to edit and experiment with their creative projects.

=== The Scanning Pool ===
The Scanning Pool were events that focused on music and the performing arts intertwined with multimedia art. After Keiko Tamaki was promoted to Director of Video Gallery SCAN, she incorporated her background in musicology and training as a pianist to promote live musical performances, mainly underground music. In 1988, she invited Christophe Charles, a French sound artist, to perform his "live electronic music", and it marked his first official concert in Japan.

=== Video festivals ===
Within a few years, SCAN was invited to showcase several of their represented artists and works from their Tape Library at global video art festivals. SCAN's participation at a multitude of events further cemented its prominent stature in contemporary art:

- 1984: “Japanese Video Art” Exhibition - The American Film Institute, Los Angeles, California
- 1984: “Japanese Video Art” Exhibition - Montreal VIDEO ‘84, Montreal, Canada
- 1989: “Japan Special” - Bonn Biennale, Bonn, Germany
- 1989: “New Tools, New Images: Art and Technology in Japan” - Europaria Japan, Belgium
- 1991: “Special Feature on Japanese Video Art” - Photo Optica Brazil, Brazil
- 1991: Japan Festival, United Kingdom
- 1992: ZKM Video Competition, Germany

By 1987, SCAN decided to form its own video festivals to generate increased artistic recognition within Japan. Electrovisions: Japan 87 Video Television Festival (1987) was held at Tokyo's Spiral art complex and was the first of three festivals SCAN organized. The event offered the public reams of engaging multimedia programming: exhibited video art, performance art, a mini-theatre, a Jean-Luc Godard film premiere, computer graphic art presentations, and research symposia.

Delicate Technology: 2nd Japan 89 Video Festival (1989) and Japan 92: 3rd Video Television Festival (1992) were hosted by SCAN and held at Spiral.

== Legacy ==
Until the founding of Video Gallery SCAN, video art as a creative medium was relegated to a much lower position in the art hierarchy in contrast to traditional fine arts (painting, sculpture, calligraphy) and cinema & television. Within a few years, Nakaya's initiative to regularly exhibit and promote contemporary Japanese and international video artists transformed the art world's perception of video art.

Alfred Birnbaum, the celebrated American literary and cultural translator of Japanese texts, clearly delineated the significance of Video Gallery SCAN as "the epicenter and launching pad for Japanese 'video art'". SCAN not only furthered the careers of established artists such as Bill Viola and Yayoi Kusama, but the Gallery's Spring and Fall competitions and open-call advertisements launched the careers of a new generation of video artists: Naoko Kurozuka, Daizaburo Harada, Ritsu Ogawa, Makoto Saito, and Yoshinobu Kurokawa.

Video Gallery SCAN's popularization of video art as an artistic medium in the 1980s spurred an affiliate program known as the Video Art Network, whereby urban video art could be more easily distributed to smaller, rural communities throughout Japan.

At the 1990 Lucarno Video Festival in Lucarno, Switzerland, Nakaya was awarded the distinguished Laser d'Or for her leadership at Video Gallery SCAN and impactful contributions to video art's proliferation and preservation.

The recognition of video art's importance as a medium in Contemporary Art History led to their inclusion in permanent collections at major museums. Many videoworks from SCAN's collections are now owned by world-renowned institutions, most notably the J. Paul Getty Museum in Los Angeles and the Kawasaki City Museum in Japan.

SCAN not only expanded the reach and influence of video art, but it also had a tremendous impact on the much broader medium of media art. After 1992, the renewed enthusiasm for video art culminated in the creation of arts & culture organizations committed specifically to preserving, exhibiting, and studying all forms of media art. Founded in 1997, the N.T.T. InterCommunication Center in the Tokyo Opera City Tower in Shinjuku is one of the largest and most active of these institutions. InterCommunication Center's mission is: "[To facilitate] a dialogue between science, technology, and artistic culture … [and] to become a center for network and information exchange, connecting artists and scientists worldwide".

Even after SCAN's physical location closed, its name became associated with other institutions’ art exhibitions, such as the N.T.T. InterCommunication Center's 1998 exhibition on the Czech-American video artist Woody Vasulka, The Brotherhood: A Series of Six Interactive Media Constructions.

== Collection highlights ==
Artist/Collective	Artwork Title	Year
Fujiko Nakaya	Friends of Minamata Victims - Video Diary	1972
Fujiko Nakaya	Statics of an Egg	1973
Keigo Yamamoto	Hand No. 2	1973
Bill Viola	Migration	1976
Bill Viola	The Space Between the Teeth	1976 - 1977
Bill Viola	Truth Through Mass Individuation	1976 - 1977
Bill Viola	The Morning After the Night of Power	1977
Bill Viola	Sweet Light	1977
Bill Viola	Moonblood	1977 - 1979
Bill Viola	Silent Life	1979
Bill Viola	Vegetable Memory	1978 - 1979
Bill Viola	Chott el-Djerid (A Portrait in Light and Heat)	1979
Norio Imai	Time Clothing	c. 1978 - 1979
Norio Imai	On air	1980
Jill Scott	Constriction	1982
Yoshitaka Shimano	For a 20 Inch Monitor	1982
Yoshitaka Shimano	Camera and My Camera Co-Relation	1983
Yoshitaka Shimano	Rolling	1984
Radical TV (Daizaburo Harada and Haruhiko Shono)	TV Army	1985
Naruaki Sasaki	Taller pole	1985
Koichi Tabata	Mizutama Hour = Polka dot time	1986
Visual Brains (Sei Kazama and Hatsune Ohtsu)	[Rec Zone]	1986
Takashi Echigoya	Intervention	1986
Yoshitaka Shimano	TV Drama	1987
Mao Kawaguchi	AV Syndrome Self Check System	1988
Akihiro Higuchi	Cue	1990
Dumb Type	Ph	1990
Jun Ariyoshi	Self Image	1991

== Notable exhibitions ==
- 1980: Bill Viola: Selected Work 1976 - 1980
- 1981: Norio Imai - Videotape Performance
- 1982: Mako Idemitsu Solo Exhibition
- 1983: Yayoi Kusama’s Self-Obliteration (Performance)
- 1983: Continuum ‘83, Australian Artists in Japan
- 1985: Gary Hill Solo Exhibition

== Exhibited artists ==
During the entirety of its operations, Video Gallery SCAN represented an array of Japanese and international video, installation, and other multimedia artists. As the only gallery in Japan that openly exhibited video art, the artists on view comprised individuals who were established figures in the Art World and a younger, rising generation of video and multimedia artists.

- Jun Ariyoshi
- Peter Callas
- Peter Campus
- Takashi Echigoya
- John Gillies
- Daizaburo Harada
- Akihiro Higuchi
- Gary Hill
- Mako Idemitsu
- Norio Imai
- Fujiko Nakaya
- Mao Kawaguchi
- Sei Kazama
- Yoshinobu Kurokawa
- Naoko Kurozuka
- Yayoi Kusama
- Kumiko Kushiyama
- Osamu Nagata
- Ritsu Ogawa
- Hatsune Ohtsu
- Nam June Paik
- Makoto Saito
- Naruaki Sasaki
- Yoshitaka Shimano
- Haruhiko Shono
- Jill Scott
- Koichi Tabata
- Woody Vasulka
- Bill Viola
- Keigo Yamamoto
