= Video Hiroba =

Japanese video art collective

Video Hiroba (Japanese: ビデオひろば, lit. Video Plaza or Public Square) was a Japanese video art collective founded as a result of the first Japanese Video Art symposium and exhibition, Video Communication/Do it Yourself Kit (February 1972), organized by Michael Goldberg, Nakaya Fujiko, and Yamaguchi Katsuhiro. Members of Video Hiroba were interested in exploring the possibilities and production of video as a form of mutual communication technology in the public sphere.

== History ==
Video Hiroba was formed in March 1972 by Japanese contemporary artists and experimental filmmakers, following the 11-day symposium Video Communication/Do it Yourself Kit at the Tokyo Sony Building. The symposium was helmed by the collective's founding members, Nakaya Fujiko and Michael Goldberg. They respectively presented on the self-reflexive and documentary capacity of video, which resulted in formal experimentations by participations that were exhibited in the later days of the symposium. Given their diverse practices and artistic backgrounds, the symposium was the first occasion that most Video Hiroba members had access to video equipment.

One of the notable works created at the symposium was Yamaguchi and Kobayashi's video performance Eat. Two performers sit at a table. One records the other eating; then they switch roles. The work experimented with the "live-ness" of video technology in that Yamaguchi and Kobayashi juxtaposed the act itself and the live video feed of it.

Upon their founding, the collective could not come to a consensus on what structure they should be organized around, and instead opted to leave it open and undefined for future evolution. However, they agreed that their aim was to expand "the possibilities of the video-tape and video communication", and Yamaguchi coined the name Video Hiroba. The word "Hiroba" can be translated as public square, and was chosen to imply public communication or thoroughfare.

=== Collaborative practice ===
Members of the collective purchased a Portapak camera, which they rented out to members for $3.50 a day. They also rented a Tokyo office space to explore collaborations and troubleshoot the technological and communication aspects of video. Video Hiroba also served as a network that provided its members opportunities to exhibit their work alongside other developments in artist video. The collective also hosted Nam June Paik in Tokyo in June 1973, holding extensive dialogues on video practices.

=== Later years ===
Within two years, the size of the collective had whittled down to five main members that continued to work together; Yamaguchi, Kawanaka, Kobayashi, Matsushita, and Nakaya. Their self-declared functions subsequently involved being an equipment access center, to (continue to) rent out Portapaks to registered members, and to be a project team to support community activities and social integration.

Vdeo Hiroba's ethos and focus on cultivating video practices led to Nakaya's founding of Video Gallery SCAN in 1980, a few years after the dissolution of the collective. Other video art collectives and organizations operating within the same time period include Nakajima Kō's Video Earth Tokyo and Tezuka Ichirō's Video Information Center.

== Productions ==
In 1974, Nakaya Fujiko and Kawanaka Nobuhiro published their translation of Michael Shamberg's 1971 book Guerilla Television (ゲリラ・テレビジョン) from Bijutsu Shuppan-sha, a text which informed the collective's video-making practice as an alternative to broadcast television.

Works of Video Hiroba members chosen for exhibition are often individual productions, but the collective actually produced both individual and collaborative works. They collaborated on events and performance projects, also filming documentary videos as part of socially engaged projects.

Notable examples include Community Video (1973), a longitudinal study on the effects of video communication on community participation commissioned by Yokohama's Economic Planning Agency. The project was led by Yamaguchi, and involved Video Hiroba members Nakaya, Kawanaka, and Kobayashi. The project was centred around video interviews, in which interviewees went through multiple rounds of interviews on their opinions regarding local urban planning and subsequently reviewed their own interviews. Through this process, participants reflected that their expressed wants during these interviews were not conclusive, confusing even. Community Video was predicated by earlier (non-government funded) explorations by Yamaguchi, Nakaya, Kobayashi, and Kawanaka in Niigata and Mito in April 1972. A similar yearlong project commissioned by the City of Kunitachi was produced by Kobayashi in 1978.

Members of Video Hiroba also published the magazine Video Express (first issue in 1974), and produced the "Video Game Festival" (August 1974) in Karuizawa.

== Members ==
The thirteen original members included:

- Hagiwara Sakumi (Japanese: 萩原朔美; b.1946, Tokyo)
- Kawanaka Nobuhiro (Japanese: かわなかのぶひろ; b. 1941, Tokyo)
- Kobayashi Hakudō (Japanese: 小林 はくどう; b. 1944, Miyagi)
- Komura Masao (Japanese: 幸村真佐男; b. 1943, Tokyo)
- Matsumoto Toshio (Japanese: 松本俊夫; b. 1932, Aichi; d. 2017)
- Miyai Rikurō (Japanese: 宮井陸郎; b. 1940, Shimane)
- Nakahara Michitaka (Japanese: ?; b. ?)
- Nakaya Fujiko (Japanese: 中谷芙二子; b. 1933, Sapporo)
- Shoko Matsushita (Japanese: ?; b. ?)
- Tōnō Yoshiaki (Japanese: 東野芳明; b. 1930, Tokyo; d. 2005)
- Yamaguchi Katsuhiro (Japanese: 山口勝弘; b. 1928, Tokyo; d. 2018)
- Yamamoto Keigo (Japanese: 山本圭吾; b. 1936, Fukui)

== Group exhibitions and screenings ==
- Video Communication/Do-lt-Yourself Kit, 1972, Sony Building, Tokyo, JP.
- Untitled Exhibition at Matrix International Video Conference (curated by Nakaya Fujiko), 1973, Vancouver, CA.
- Tokyo-New York Video Express (produced by Kubota Shigeko, Video Hiroba and the Underground Center of the Tenjosajiki Hall), January 1974, Tokyo, JP.
- Video Kyoto 1974, 1974, Signum Gallery, Kyoto, JP.
- Video Art, 1975, Institute of Contemporary Art, University of Pennsylvania, Philadelphia, USA.
- Japan Video Art Festival. 33 artists at CAyC (Curated by Jorge Glusberg), 1978, Centro de Arte y Comunicación, Buenos Aires, AR.
- Video from Tokyo to Fukui and Kyoto (Curated by Barbara London), 1979, Museum of Modern Art, New York City, USA.
- "Japanese Video from the Lydia Modi Vitale Collection: Selected Tapes from Video Hiroba:, May 4, 1980, Berkeley Art Museum and Pacific Film Archive, Berkeley, USA.
- Japanese Television and Video: An Historical Survey (curated by Nakaya Fujiko), 1984, American Film Institute, Los Angeles, USA.
- "Vital Signals: Japanese and American Video Art from the 1960s and 70s", October 2009, Los Angeles County Museum of Art, Los Angeles, USA.
- "MAM Research 004: Video Hiroba - Reexamining the 1970s Experimental Video Art Group", 2016–2017, Mori Art Museum, Tokyo, JP.
- Video Communication Art and Technology between Canada and Japan, 1967 -1985 (curated by Jesse Cummings), 2020, VIVO Media Arts Centre, Vancouver, CA.

== Bibliography ==
- London, Barbara. (1992). "Electronic Explorations". Art in America May, 120.
- London, Barbara. (Ed.). (1979). Video from Tokyo to Fukui and Kyoto. Museum of Modern Art.
- Glusberg, Jorge. (1978). Japan Video Art Festival: 33 Artists. Center of Art and Communication, Buenos Aires, April 1978. CAYC.
- Nakaya, Fujiko. (1973). "Japan - VIDEO HIROBA". Artscanada, 30(4), 52–53.
- Nishikawa, Tomonari. (2015). "Film Independents and Japanese Underground Cinema: An Interview with Tomohiro Nishimura". Millennium Film Journal, (61), 30–37.
- Nygren, Scott. "Paper Screen: Video Art in a Japanese Context." Journal of Film and Video 39, no. 1 (1987): 27–35. http://www.jstor.org/stable/20687754.

=== Forthcoming ===
- Horisaki-Christens, Nina. (2021). "VIDEO HIROBA: Contingent Publics and Video Communication, 1966-1985" (Columbia University, J. Reynolds).
