= The Artist Is Present =

The Artist Is Present may refer to:

- The Artist Is Present, a book and a recurring series of art installations by Regina Frank
- The Artist Is Present, a performance art piece by Marina Abramović
- Marina Abramović: The Artist Is Present, a 2012 documentary about the performance art piece
