= Somanouchi Kofun cluster =

Kofun period keyhole-shaped burial mound in Japan

Somanouchi Kofun Cluster
- 杣之内古墳群 (Japanese)
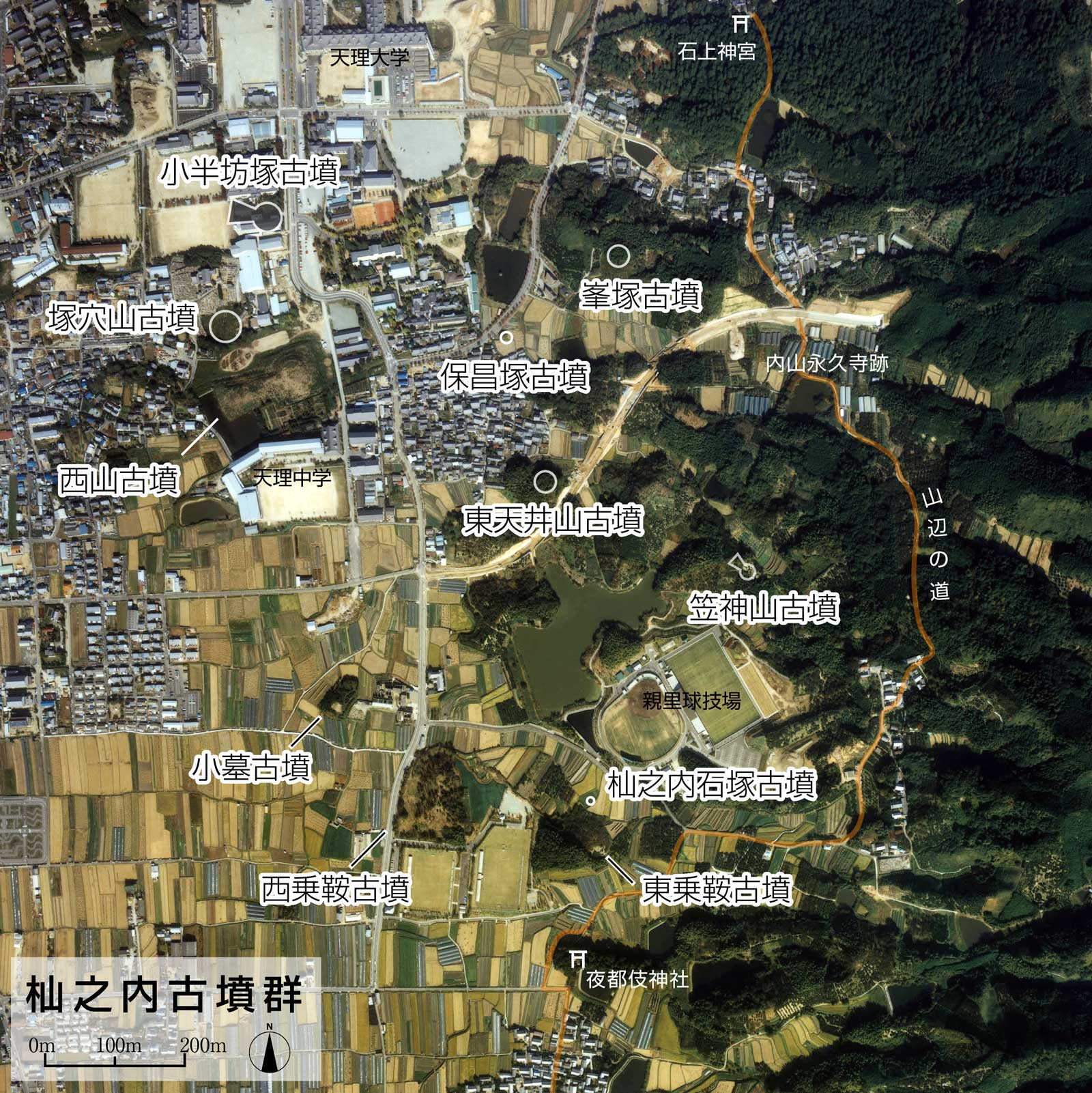
- Somanouchi Kofun Cluster

- Somanouchi Kofun Cluster Somanouchi Kofun cluster (Japan)
- Interactive map of Somanouchi Kofun Cluster
- 34°35′33″N 135°50′36″E
- Type: Kofun
- Periods: Kofun period
- Location: Tenri, Nara, Japan
- Region: Kansai region

History
- Built: c.4th- 7th century

Site notes
- Public access: Yes (no facilities)

Somanouchi Kofun cluster (杣之内古墳群) is a cluster of Kofun period burial mounds, located in the Somanouchi-cho, Magata-cho, and Otogi-cho neighborhoods of the city of Tenri, Nara in the Kansai region of Japan. The Nishiyama Kofun was designated a National Historic Site of Japan in 1927, and the Nishinokura Kofun was added to the designation in 2018, with the name of the National Historic Site changing from the "Nishiyama Kofun" to the "Somanouchi Kofun cluster".

== Overview ==
Located south of the Furu River, the tumuli are built on hills to the south of Isonokami Shrine. The shape of the mounds is characterized by a transition from keyhole-shaped to giant circular tombs. From the location, there is a theory that these the tombs of the chiefs of the Mononobe clan.

Somanouchi Kofun Cluster
Name	Image	Type	Dimensions	burial facility
Nishiyama Kofun (西山古墳)	Modified zenpō-kōhō-fun (前方後方墳)	early Kofun period	183 meters	National Historic Site
Kohanabozuka Kofun (小半坊塚古墳)	zenpō-kōen-fun (前方後円墳)	early Kofun period	92 meters	destroyed in World War II
Kohaka Kofun (小墓古墳)	zenpō-kōen-fun (前方後円墳)	middle Kofun period	80 meters	excavated in 1978
Kasagamiyama Kofun (笠神山古墳)	zenpō-kōen-fun (前方後円墳)	middle Kofun period	45 meters	
Nishinorikura Kofun (西乗鞍古墳)	zenpō-kōen-fun (前方後円墳)	late Kofun period (early 6th century)	120 meters	National Historic Site
Higashinorikura Kofun (東乗鞍古墳)	zenpō-kōen-fun (前方後円墳)	late Kofun period (mid 6th century)	75 meters	
Tsukaana Kofun (塚穴山古墳)	enpun (円墳)	late Kofun period	46 meters	The construction is the same as that of Ishibutai Kofun
Minezuka Kofun (峯塚古墳)	enpun (円墳)	late Kofun period	35 meters	
Hoshozuka Kofun (保昌塚古墳)	enpun (円墳)	late Kofun period	25–35 meters	now partly destroyed

=== Nishiyama Kofun ===
The Nishiyama Kofun (西山古墳) is located on the grounds of Tenri High School (34°35′33″N 135°50′36″E). It is believed to have been built in the early Kofun period (4th century), making it the oldest of the Somanouchi Kofun Group. The tumulus has a unique shape, with the lowest tier having a two-conjoined rectangle zenpō-kōhō-fun (前方後方墳) shape, and the central and upper tiers having a zenpō-kōen-fun (前方後円墳) shaped, which look like a keyhole with one square end and one circular end when viewed from above. This is the only known example of such a design in Japan. The lowest tier consists of two square mounds measuring 90 meters on each side. The middle tier has a circular posterior section 72 meters in diameter, and a rectangular anterior portion with a length of 90 meters. The top of the tumulus is flat, with a diameter of 30 meters and continues with a long and narrow front section for seven meters. The rear of the tumulus is 15 meters high and the front section is ten meters high. The burial chamber is believed to have been a vertical entry pit-type stone chamber, which has been robbed, most recently in World War II, when the Imperial Japanese Army set up an anti-aircraft gun emplacement and removed many of the stones. The tumulus is orientated to the west, and was once surrounded by a stepped square moat, which has now been filled-in. The tumulus is located on a gentle slope, making effective use of the natural terrain, so the width of the moat is not constant.

Fragments of a bronze mirror, jasper arrowheads, tubular beads, and fragments of an iron sword and an iron knife have been excavated from the posterior circular portion. A jasper wheel stone was discovered in the moat on the south side of the anterior portion. Fukiishi and fragments of haniwa have been found, including cylindrical haniwa, finned cylindrical haniwa, and house-shaped haniwa.

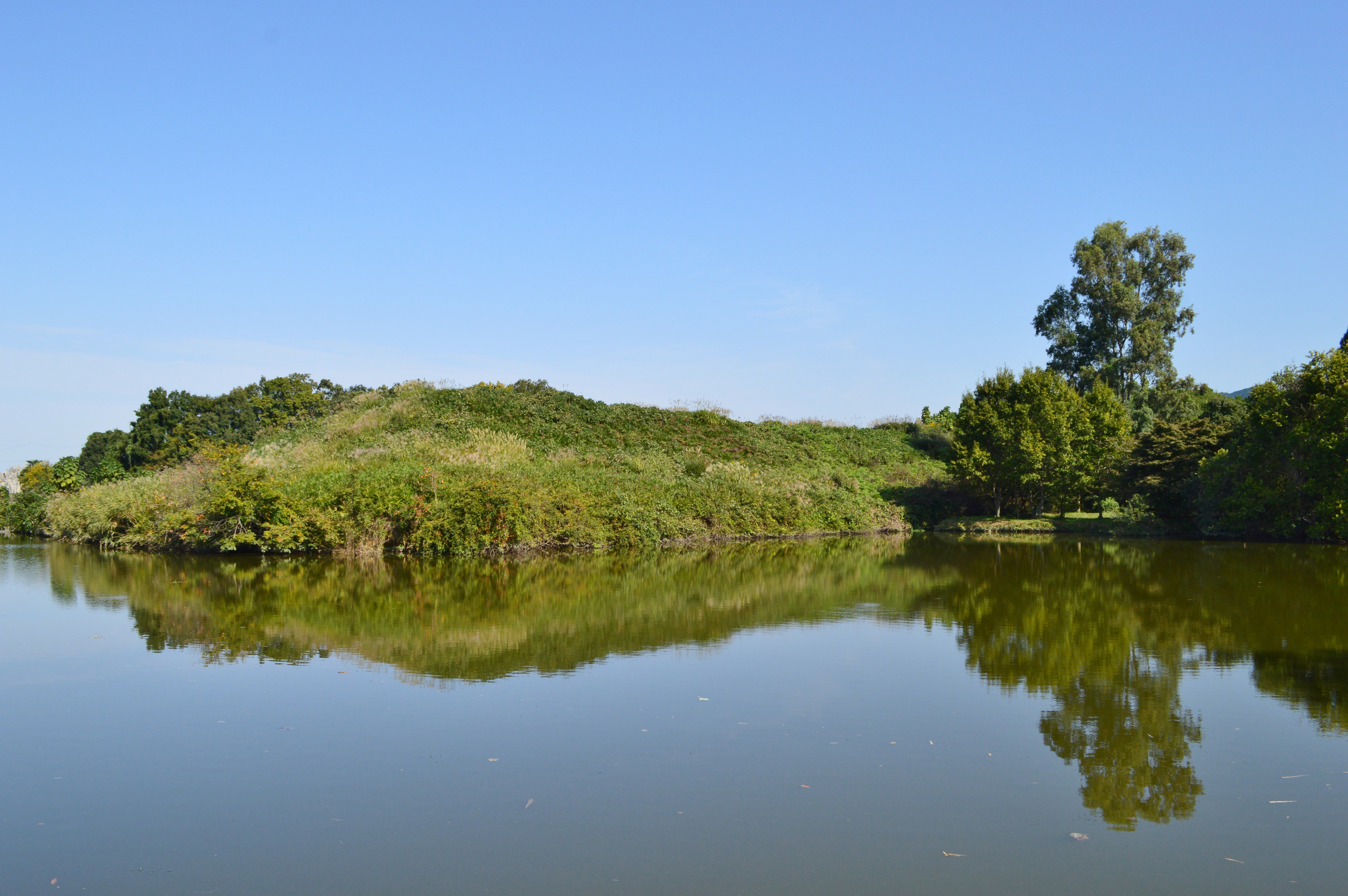
Nishiyama Kofun

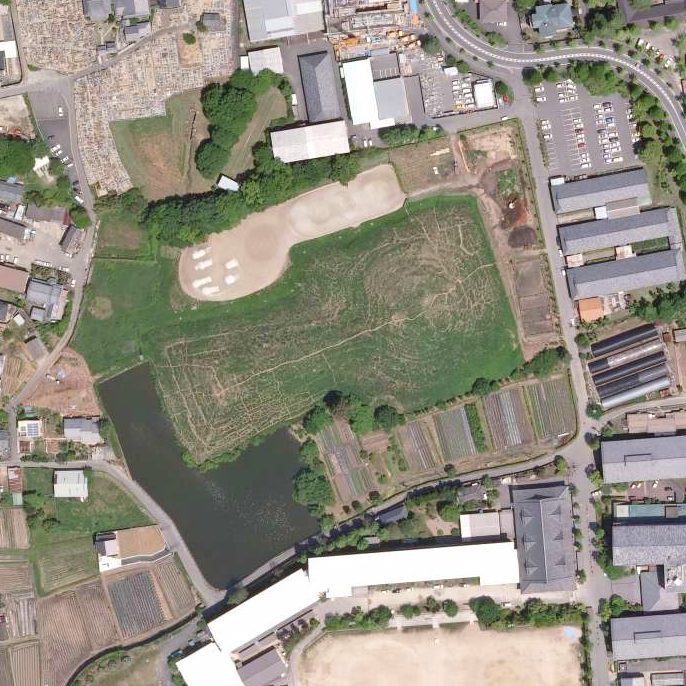
Aerial view of NIshiyama Kofun

The tumulus is about a 20-minute walk from Tenri Station on the JR West Sakurai Line.

=== Nishinorikura Kofun ===
The Nishinorikura Kofun (西乗鞍古墳) is a zenpō-kōen-fun (前方後円墳) keyhole-shaped tumulus built by cutting into the foot of a hill stretching from east-to-west on the eastern edge of the Nara Basin (34°35′9.68″N 135°50′44.56″E). It is the second largest in the Somanouchi Kofun Group after the Nishiyama Kofun. The tumulus is orientated to the south and is constructed in two tiers. The posterior circular portion has a diameter of 66 meters and height of 15.5 meters; the anterior rectangular port has a width of 88 meters and height of 16 meters. The tumulus was used as an observation point by Emperor Hirohito in 1932, when he observed military training maneuvers in the vicinity, and has been excavated four times since 1981. Cylindrical and figurative haniwa clay figures have been found on the outside of the tumulus. There are also projections on the east and west sides of the narrow part of the tumulus. The mound is surrounded by an inner moat and an outer bank (now buried and forming a flat area), and the total length including these is about 165 meters from north-to-south. Furthermore, portions of outer moats are also found on the south and east sides, so it is believed that the tumulus originally had a double moat. The burial chamber is unclear, but it is possible that it was a horizontal-entry stone chamber. The grave goods are also unclear, but Sue ware and Haji ware pottery have been found with the excavated haniwa. From this pottery, the construction date of the tumulus is estimated to be around the end of the 5th century, or the end of the middle Kofun period.

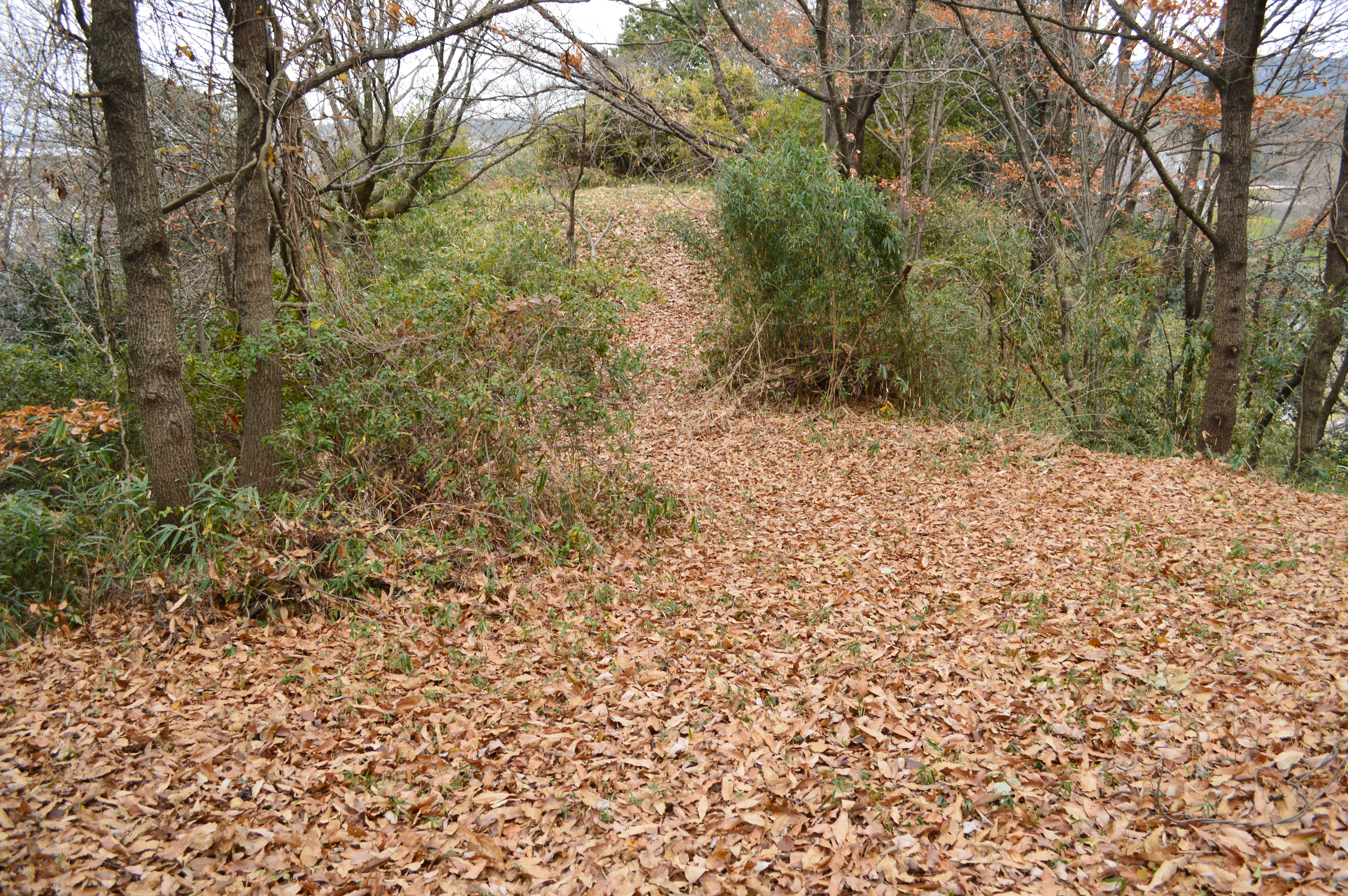
View of the rear mound from the front part

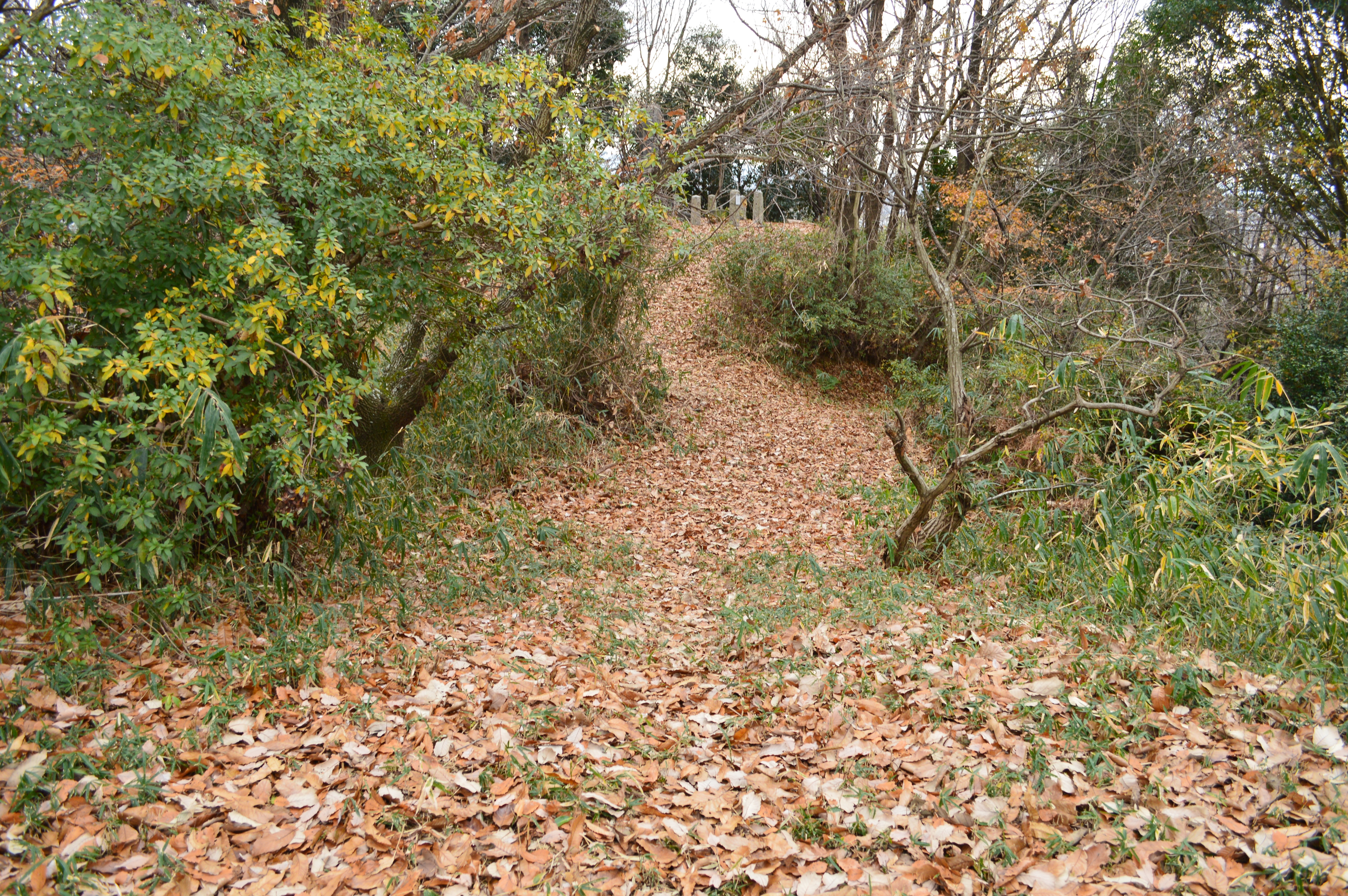
View of the front part from the rear mound

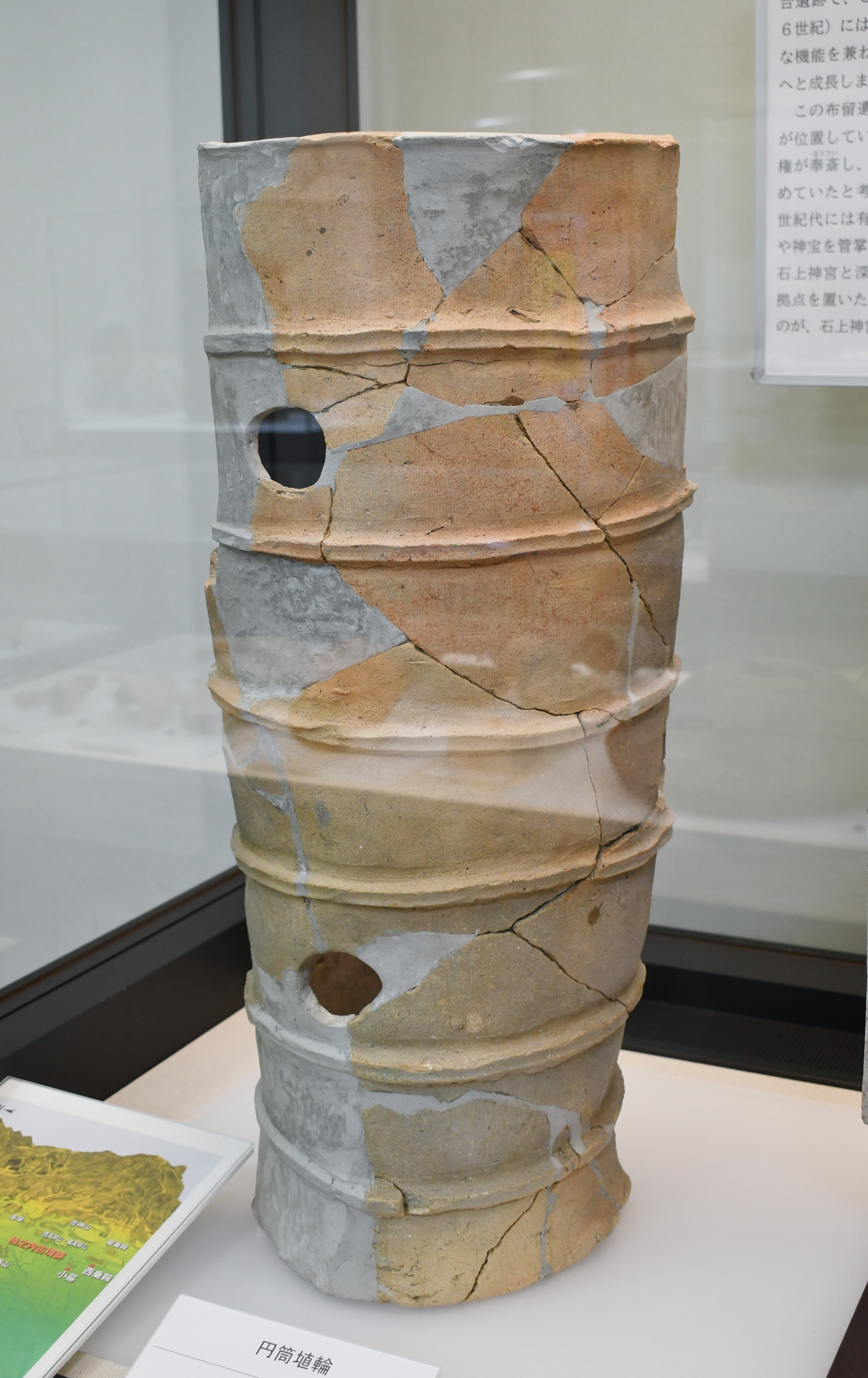
Cylindrical Haniwa excavated from Nishinorikura Kofun

== See also ==
- List of Historic Sites of Japan (Nara)
