= Jill Scott =

Jill Scott may refer to:

- Jill Scott (racing driver) (1903–1974), English racing driver
- Jill Scott (media artist) (born 1952), Australian media artist
- Jill Scott (singer) (born 1972), American singer and songwriter
- Jill Scott (footballer) (born 1987), English footballer

== See also ==
- Gil Scott-Heron (1949–2011), American soul and jazz poet, musician, and author
