= Kenjiro Okazaki =

Japanese robotics designer

- 岡崎 乾二郎 (Okazaki Kenjirō)
- Born: October 24, 1955 (age 70)
- Occupations: visual artist, robotics designer
- Known for: designing robots for studies in natural computing and perception

Kenjirō Okazaki (岡崎 乾二郎, Okazaki Kenjirō; born October 24, 1955) is a Japanese visual artist and robotics designer whose works span several genres, including painting, sculpture (reliefs and constructions), as well as landscape design and architecture.

== Career ==
Many of Okazaki's visual works have been featured in public collections throughout Japan and in various exhibitions around the world. In 2002, Okazaki participated in the Venice Biennale as the director of the Japanese pavilion of the 8th International Architecture Exhibition. His recent works include a collaborative dance performance "I love my robots" with the choreographer Trisha Brown which premiered in early 2007.

He is active as a theoretician and critic and is the author or co-author of several books, including Renaissance: Condition of Experience (Chikuma, 2001), featuring his analysis of Filippo Brunelleschi; Ready for Painting! (Asahi Press, 2005), a dialogue with the artist Hisao Matsuura; and Articulation of Arts: technological analyses (FilmArt, 2007). He has also created picture books in collaboration with Japanese poets, including Little Lellolello with Kyong-Mi Park (Shogakukan Inc. 2004), and Popahpe Popipappu with Shuntaro Tanikawa (Crayon House, 2004).

Okazaki has also designed robots for studies into topics such as natural computing and perception.

== Texts by Kenjiro Okazaki ==
A Place to Bury Names(about Isamu Noguchi and Shirai Seiichi)

LIVING BETWEEN DIVERSITY OF TIME(about OWN WORKS)

The lucid, unclouded fog―the movement of bright and swinging water particles.(about FUJIKO NAKAYA)

Abstract Art as Impact(HTML/PDF)
