= Regina Frank =

German artist

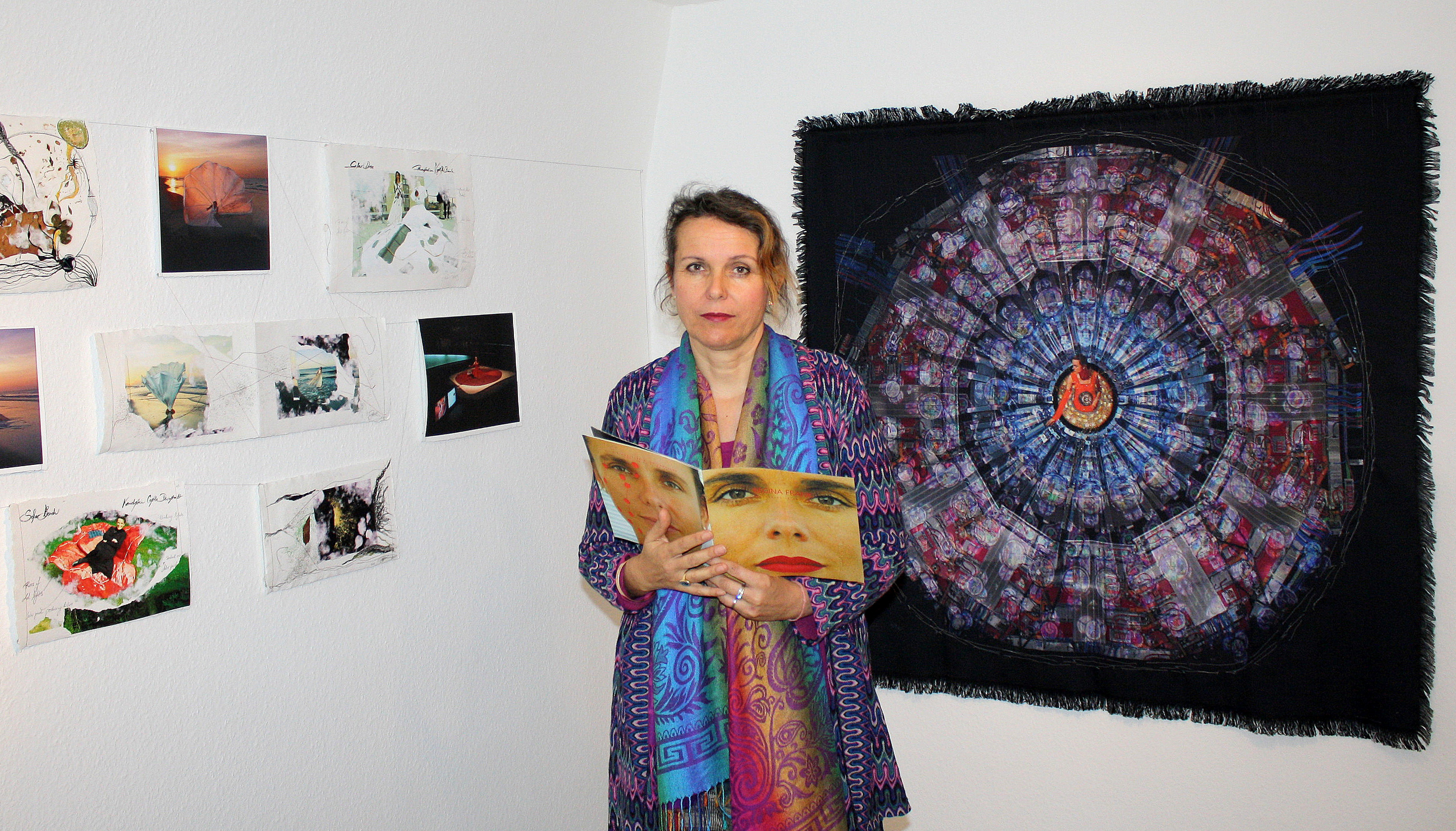
- Frank standing in front of Sacré Coeur Collider at her exhibition at IWZ International Forest Art Center
- Born: 1965 (age 60–61); Meßkirch, Germany
- Education: Freie Universität Berlin; Universität der Künste Berlin
- Style: Textile arts

Regina Frank is a German artist mainly working with text and textile installation and performance. Since 1989, she has been one of the pioneers of combining performance art with technology, integrating the Internet and interactive social software installations. Her performances and installations deal with social and political-social issues and link digital media with traditional text transformed into textiles.

== Early life and education ==
Frank was born in 1965, the daughter of Elisabeth Frank and Franz Josef Frank. She grew up in Meßkirch, Germany, where she kept a home until the death of her mother 2016. Due to the families’ and her home-towns close connection to Martin Heidegger, she devoted much of her youth to art and philosophy, later venturing into Zen Buddhism and Advaita Vedanta. She studied Sinology and Sanskrit, Old Oriental Studies at Freie Universität Berlin until she got accepted at the costume design department and later at the Visual Arts Department at Universität der Künste Berlin.

Here she did her Masters with Katharina Sieverding. As a tutor she taught photography and printing and organized many artist talks between 1990 and 1992, among others with John Cage, Joan Jonas, Marina Abramović, Alfredo Jaar, Antoni Muntadas, Joseph Kosuth, Dara Birnbaum, Christina Kubisch, Hans Haacke, Guerilla Girls, Stephen Willats and Nan Goldin. She was a founding member of the student organization Interflugs, which represented the students interests to the administration and to professors, and gave access to at the time advanced technological equipment, such as computers, video projectors, editing equipment and video cameras. Together with her fellow students, she advocated equal rights and demanded a higher share of women as female professors at the still predominantly male college of arts. Consequently, she was very active in the student strike.

In addition to a number of subtle performances and photographic works dealing with political themes, such as golf war, AIDS, she held her studio first in a squat and later above a homeless asylum in Berlin. She supported various forms of demonstrations in public space for equality, integration of foreigners and acceptance of homosexuals and collected funds for various social purposes. (ShoeshineWoman, Condom and Toy- vending machines in Clubs, See you do not look, The Artist Is Present). "The Artist Is Present" was seen in the political-social sense as presence and response-ability of the artist.

For more than a decade she was accompanied by Fernando Pessoa's "The Book of Disquiet", introducing him as her soulmate, many times reserving a space next to her for him. Together with a group of friends she was crashing opening parties in painters protection suits and masks made from photocopies of self-portraits of famous painters such as Max Ernst, Pablo Picasso, Vincent van Gogh demonstrating for artists rights. She lived various times as Frank going out with a mustache and side-burns. She actively danced Tango from 1986 onwards and did many public performances with one female or one male partner, on a private occasion she danced with/for Astor Piazzolla, while he was improvising on his Bandoneon.

Most times when asked for her contact she gave her card which was deprived of all information except "The Artist is Present" or Regina Frank "The Artist is Present" in the early 90s. As this was long before search engines the card was useless to get in touch with her. Though her whole appearance delivered material for performances, it was not until she personally met John Cage in 1990 and organized a workshop for him at the University of Art that she discovered the power and potential of performance to integrate in her own artwork. She played chess with him and documented the game as a "photographic artpiece". Shortly after she organized another workshop for Marina Abramović and later an exhibition with her classmates during Marina's guest professorship at the University of Art, Berlin. Consequently, she was invited to participate in many museum exhibitions with her performance installations, which kept her collages, drawings and paintings largely unknown.

== Career ==
Frank has been exhibiting her installations under the title "The Artist is Present" internationally in windows, museums and public spaces. Her first book "The Artist is Present" was published in 1999. Inspired by the adaptation of Regina Frank's title at Marina Abramović's MOMA exhibition The Artist Is Present after 21 years in 2010, Frank changed to "The Art is Present" in 2015, introducing the focus on the Art: going deeper into the present and the artist's gift. Later 2017 she advanced to the motto and overall title “The HeArT is Present”. Using the dress to address, her work is a creative information processing, data visualization, bridging handiwork and technology, tangible and virtual, creating incentives for communication, discussion and dialogues.

Frank has lectured at M.I.T. Boston, Saint Martin's School of Art London, New York University, the MET, the School of the Art Institute of Chicago and School of the Museum of Fine Arts in Boston. She was artist in resident at Wacoal Art Center, in Tokamachi and S-AIR Sapporo in Japan, Kio-A-Thau Residency Taiwan, Guangzhou-Live-4 China, Montalvo Arts Center, USA, Universitat Politècnica de València, Spain and Chienkuo Technology University Taiwan. Her works have been displayed at the New Museum of Contemporary Art in New York, Serpentine Gallery in London, the Bronx Museum in New York, Kunsthalle in Berlin, Reina Sofia in Madrid, MOCA in Los Angeles, Spiral Wacoal Art Center in Tokyo and at the 1996 Olympic Games in Atlanta, ARCO in Madrid, 2001 Expo Hannover and 2003 San Diego Museum of Art. iLAND launched in 2011 and in 2013 during the Venice Biennale (Infr’action) and 2017 at London Artfair. Since 2013 iLAND was shown in the US, Portugal, Finland, France, Holland and China and 2018 at the MAAT (Museum of Art, Architecture and Technology) in Lisbon.

Frank's work has been featured in many publications including: Sculpture Magazine, Studio Art Magazine, Asahi Evening News, Studio Voice, Screen Multimedia, Parade Magazine, Harper's, The New York Times, in Time Out Rethinking Marxism, Vogue, Cosmopolitan, Frankfurter Rundschau, FAZ, Japan Times, Contemporary Art, Art Papers, Art Examiner, The Atlanta Journal-Constitution Art Press, Being on Line, Arte y Parte, Public Art and Ecology On the Issues Magazine and Allgemeine Zeitung.

=== Works ===
L’Adieu Pearls before Gods (1993) dealt with human rights issues and global labor division. With a 28-day performance in the window of the New Museum of Contemporary Art she drew attention to the global underpayment in the textile industry. While she embroidered pearls on a white silk dress, she received a different hourly wage every day, calculated by the average wage of 28 different countries, paid by Westminster Bank. On her first day she earned $17.10 an hour for Norway, decreasing to 20 cents (the average cost for a worker in Indonesia in 1992 according to apparel data). Her decreasing wages were published in the Dow Jones stock index. She bought flowers and bread, symbolically as food for body and soul, and to reveal the purchasing power of her wages. The installation, which was produced during this performance, was sold to Robert J. Shiffler's collection through auction at Christies. A part of the proceeds went to a foundation that worked for the rights of illegally entrenched textile workers, who were held, like slaves, in small factories in New York 's sweatshops around the corner of the museum. The work was extensively discussed. In addition to some TV portraits, articles in Parade Magazine, Harper's Bazaar, Cosmopolitan and Vogue appeared.

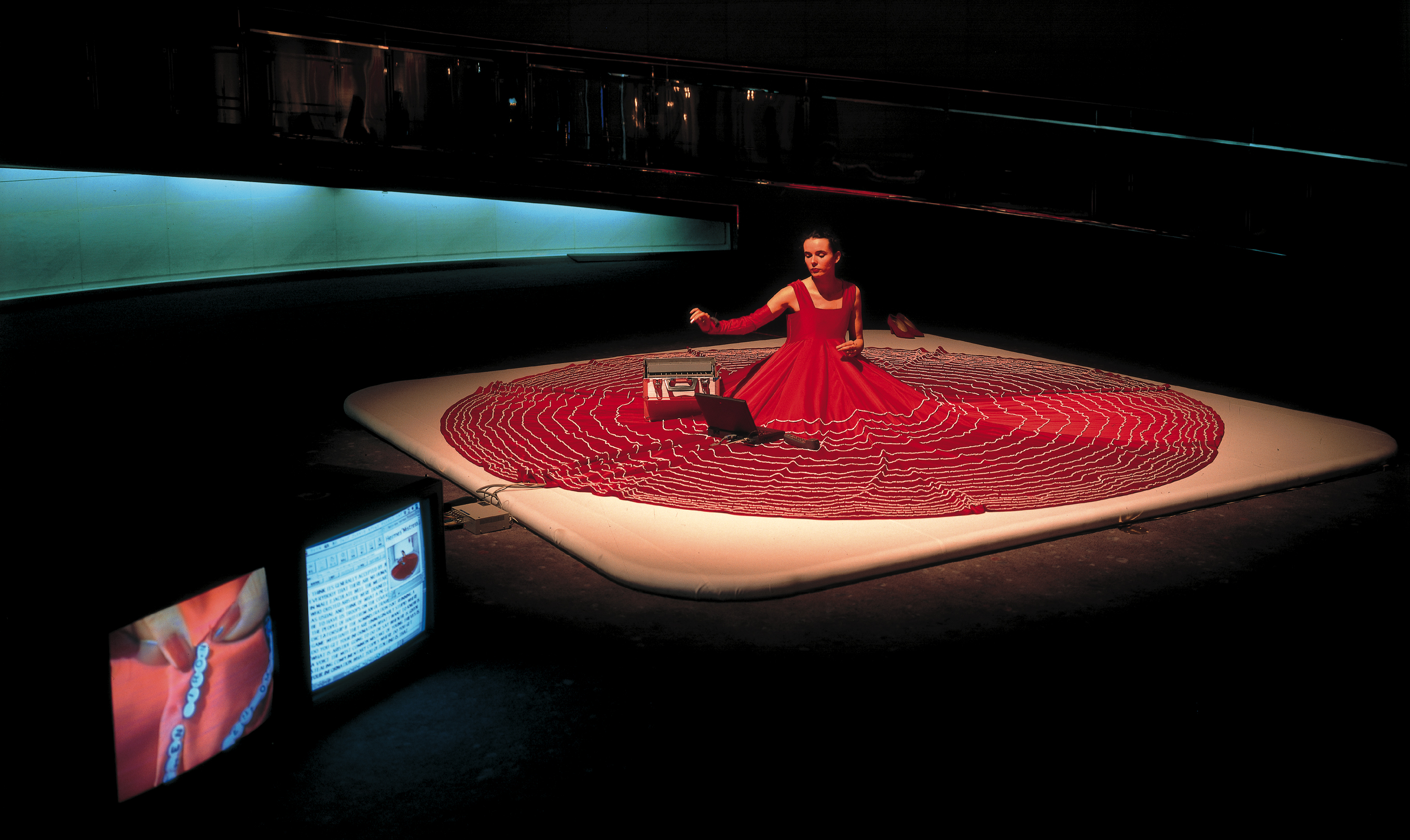
Regina Frank "The Artist is Present" travelled as Hermes Mistress to Europe, USA and Asia from 1994 to 2001. Spiral Wacoal Art Center Tokyo

Hermes' Mistress" From 1993 onwards, she dealt with the Internet as a steadily growing source of information. "Hermes' Mistress" investigated the meaning of this flood of information, by sitting 777 hours in different museums, “harvesting" information that touched her from the Internet and spelling it out stitching letter for letter on an island-like red dress. (26,226 letter beads). Hermes Mistress was shown first at Exit Art, New York, and after travelled to Kunsthalle, Berlin / Museum of Contemporary Art (MOCA), Los Angeles / Bronx Museum of the Arts, New York / Spiral Wacoal Art Center Tokyo, Museo Nacional Centro de Arte Reina Sofía, Madrid / Kampnagel, Hamburg / UNESCO, Paris / Fondapol, Paris / Shih Chien University (Taiwan).

In the GlassBeadGame, 1996(named after Hermann Hesse's novel), during the 1996 Summer Olympics in Atlanta, she dealt with art as a source of international exchange and a contribution to peace. (See MIT-Press "Conversations at the Castle"). For this interactive performance installation, she wove a "magic mantle" (kimono) from favorite books and quotes. Visitors were able to contribute to the installation via the Internet: with virtual pearls from texts and poems, generated by a computer program. Frank in her own video: “There was a space where there was no winner and no loser, an Olympic game for everyone – a possibility to be present, regardless of space and time.” With the Glass Bead Game, Frank succeeded in gaining acceptance in the Japanese market, which later extended to Taiwan and China. She worked with Pixelpark creating software and later with Media Service Group, with whom she worked as well on Inner Networks in 2000, creating a large calendar and a series of prints.

Between 1995 and 1999 Regina Frank worked with the Internet and developed works like A-dress. Similar to the later "blogging", she wrote a letter to her own dress every day for 97 days, acting as an address. The letter was available daily on a website, but at the exhibition at the Winnipeg Art Gallery in Canada, the texts were printed on white sheets, and filled the inside of her dress, linked to withered and ink-dyed leaves on the outer surface. The work was used as a cover for the book "Negotiating Domesticity" by Hilde Heynen and Gülsum Baydar, published by Routledge.

In 1999, she developed a Mushroom Dress for the Philippseich Castle Park literally growing a dress from mushrooms which she consumed with visitors. During the Expo 2000 in Hanover, she sat under the title Performance&Performance in the shop window of the International Women's University pavilion and was literally linked to the stock market by a real-time connection. For seven hours, she sat still and with very slow movements she reflected the rising and falling of stocks, thematizing the manipulative involvement of the stock-market with human everyday life. In 2001 for the Intermediale Mainz she created Food for Soul feeding people with quotes and fresh fruit and vegetables in a white enormous dress celebrating abundance.

In 2002 What is Black? What is White?, Frank built a camera into an ink brush, thus showing the process of writing of the answers from above and from the perspective of the camera, and eliminating the perspective of the artist. In the white installation space the form of the dress gradually became visible as the black text spiraled outward.

In 2003 Whiteness in Decay at the San Diego Museum of Art, she asked: What feeds your soul? More than 3000 responses were projected on a canvas behind her plaster cast. She was covered in plaster for this performance and slowly freed herself from the hard white shell, peeling the fruits and vegetables from her crust and share them with the audience. A process from a white fragile doll into a colorful human painting and being. She taught masterclasses for Bauhaus Dessau in 2003, directed a group performance at Bauhaus Dessau with young performers and curated an exhibition in 2004 in an abandoned shopping center right next to Bauhaus.

In 2004 she started Sharing Silence with the Museum of Modern Art and SAIR residency in Sapporo which she continued in Taiwan, Germany, France, UK and Portugal until 2011 for seven years, spending 7 minutes to 7 hours in silence with complete strangers.

From 2005 to 2007 she developed Dreamweaving a game for children and adults encoding text into images, turning poetry into pictures and again text into textile. The game was available in English, German and Portuguese, due to a grant by the Calouste Gulbenkian Foundation.

In 2005 she worked on the social software and performance project Constellations for FEA (Federal Environmental Agency, Germany) where she photographed more than 400 employees and up to three chosen items per person, connecting and introducing them to each other.

In 2007, Frank turned 67 years old and committed to go on a seven-year sabbatical from established art institutions. She continued working on Sharing Silence as an ongoing performance and developed several unpublished performances investigating the ready made of Marcel Duchamp within. It was supposed to lead into the culminating phase of "The Artist is Present," a 28-year project, conceived in 1989, but when Marina Abramović used her title at MOMA, she realized that the artist could be confused with the body mind organism and changed. "The HeArt is Present" was dropping the "ist" of the Artist in favor of a greater self and a less personal identity and a reminder for the inspiring entity within all of us. It is also during this time that she returns to her painting and drawing, culminating in an exhibition at her home town at Meßkirch Castle entitled "The Art is Present" in 2017 after her seven-year-sabbatical.

iLAND 2011–2018, is a series of performances in public space, (streets, beaches, landings etc.), dealing with environmental issues. iLAND shows the imbalanced zones of our planet in a textile collage together with intact landscapes, which have not yet been haunted by disasters in the last 500 years. Aerial photographs and topographical images were changed, painted, printed and combined in photomontages. The dress and the sculpture became an island of discussion, a vehicle for communication and a field for common reflections. In her performance, she moves so slowly that the movement can only be perceived in time-lapse, almost like the growth of a plant, as we see the effect of our actions often only after when we fast forward.

Regina Frank's work is inspired by Sufism (Rumi), Zen meditation, and Advaita Vedanta. Poets such as Fernando Pessoa and various Philosophers such as Ludwig Wittgenstein, Martin Heidegger. Samuel Beckett could be seen as an important influence, as well as Johannes Vermeer, Henri Michaux, Joseph Beuys, as well as the German Fluxus movement.

== Membership ==
Independent Performance Group

== Publications ==
- Regina Frank. The Artist Is Present. Performances 1992–1999, Berlin, 1999, ISBN 3-00-004290-3
- Regina Frank. The Art Is Present – On Paper, Freier Berliner Verlag, Berlin, 2015, ISBN 978-3-945669-74-7
- Regina Frank. The HeArt Is Present Regina Frank – In Space, Freier Berliner Verlag, Berlin, 2015, ISBN 978-3-945669-74-7
- Conversations at The Castle: Changing Audiences and Contemporary Art, by Mary Jane Jacob and Michael Brenson, Homi K. Bhabha, MIT Press, USA, 1998, pp. 20–25, ISBN 0-262-10072-X
- Divisions of Labor, Lydia Yee, catalogue, Bronx Museum of the Arts / MOCA, Los Angeles, USA, 1995

== Performances, Installations and Exhibitions (selection) ==
- The Art Is Present – Regina Frank, Meßkirch, 2015
- Das Netz, der Stoff und das Dazwischen, 2013
- Kunstbiennale „Vogelfrei“, Jagdschloss Kranichstein, FAZ, 2011
- Ästhetik mit Energiekonzept vereint, 2008
- Konstellationen, Umweltbundesamt, PDF, 2005
- L'Adieu Pearls before Gods, Rethinking Marxism
- L'Adieu Pearls before Gods, New Museum Archive
