= Ishibutai Kofun =

Stone megalithic tumulus near Nara, Japan

- 石舞台古墳 (Japanese)
- Ishibutoya Kofun
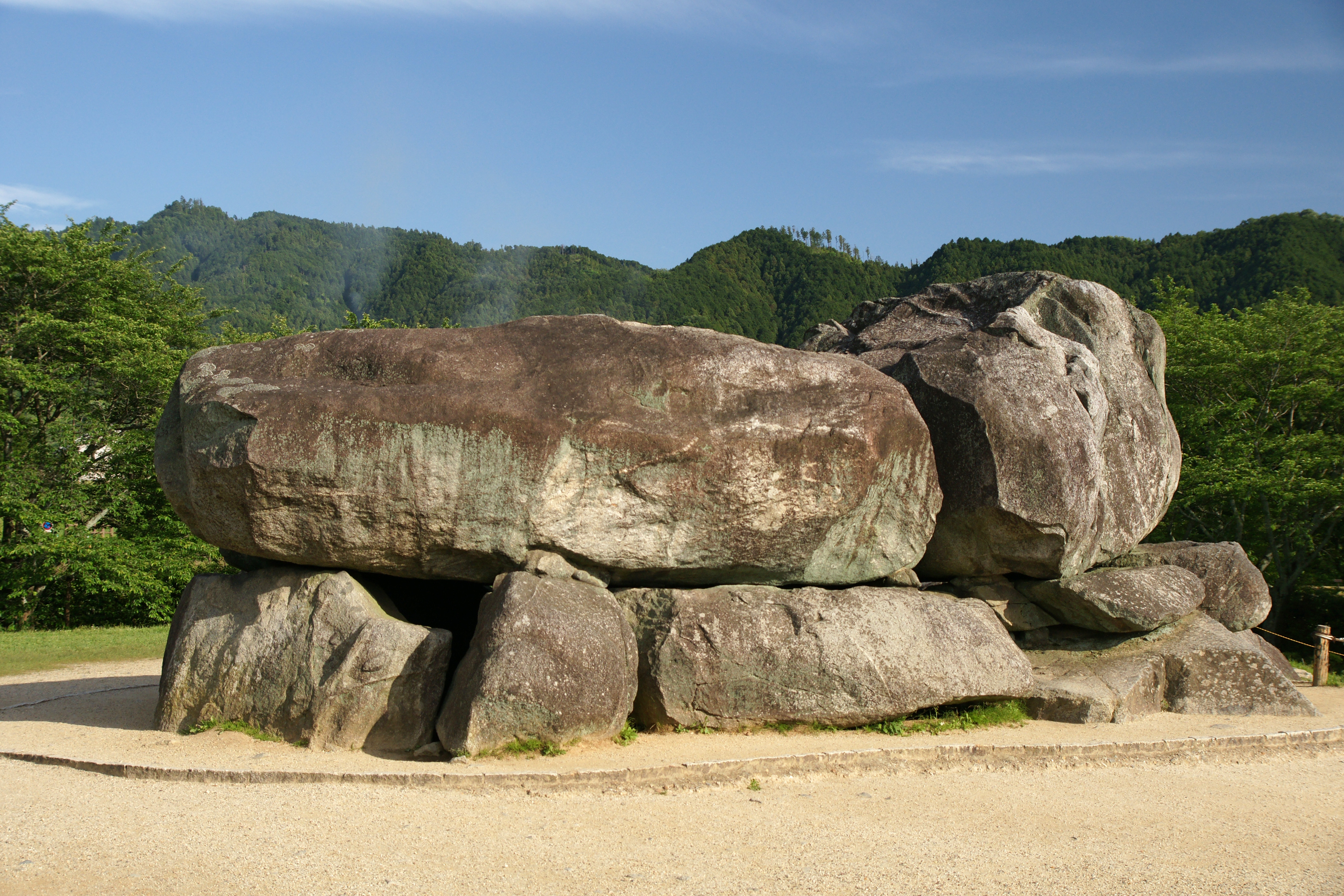
- Ishibutai Kofun

- Ishibutai Kofun Ishibutai Kofun (Japan)
- Interactive map of Ishibutai Kofun
- 34°28′0.7″N 135°49′34.1″E
- Type: Kofun
- Periods: Asuka period
- Location: Asuka, Nara Prefecture, Japan
- Region: Kansai

Site notes
- Area: 27 m^{2} (291 sq ft)
- Public access: Yes

Ishibutai kofun (石舞台古墳) is a Kofun period burial mound, located in the village of Asuka, Nara in the Kansai region of Japan. The tumulus was designated a National Historic Site of Japan in 1935. In 1954 the designation was elevated to a Special Historic Sites (特別史跡, tokubetsu shiseki), The kofun is also known as the Ishibutoya (石太屋) Kofun.

== Overview ==
The Ishibutai Kofun occupies an area of 27 m^{2} (291 sq ft), and is the largest known megalithic structure in Japan. It is located 5 km from Tanzan Shrine. It was originally covered by a mound made of piled up earth, but the earth has disappeared, exposing a horizontal stone burial chamber made of huge stones.

=== Name ===
The name of the kofun in Japanese is a combination of two words, the first, ishi (石), meaning "stone", and the second, butai (舞台), meaning "stage". The name of the kofun therefore originates in its resemblance to a large stone stage. The Ishibutai kofun has been known by this name at least as early as the Tokugawa period, as evidenced by its entry in the Saigoku sanjūsansho meisho zue, a large guide to Buddhist pilgrimage sites written by Kanenari Akatsuki in 1853.

=== Association with Soga no Umako ===
The Ishibutai Kofun is inferred to be the tomb of Soga no Umako (559? - 626), and his death during the reign of Empress Suiko is recorded in the Nihon Shoki.

Summer, 5th month, 20th day. The Oho-omi died. He was buried in the tomb at Momohama.

The historian and archeologist Sadakichi Kita (1871 - 1939) proposed that the Ishibutai Kofun is the above-mentioned "Momohana" tomb in the Nihon Shoki. Kita also proposed that the earthen mound of the Ishibutai Kofun was removed after Soga no Umako's death as a punishment of the Soga clan by the imperial government.

=== Structure ===
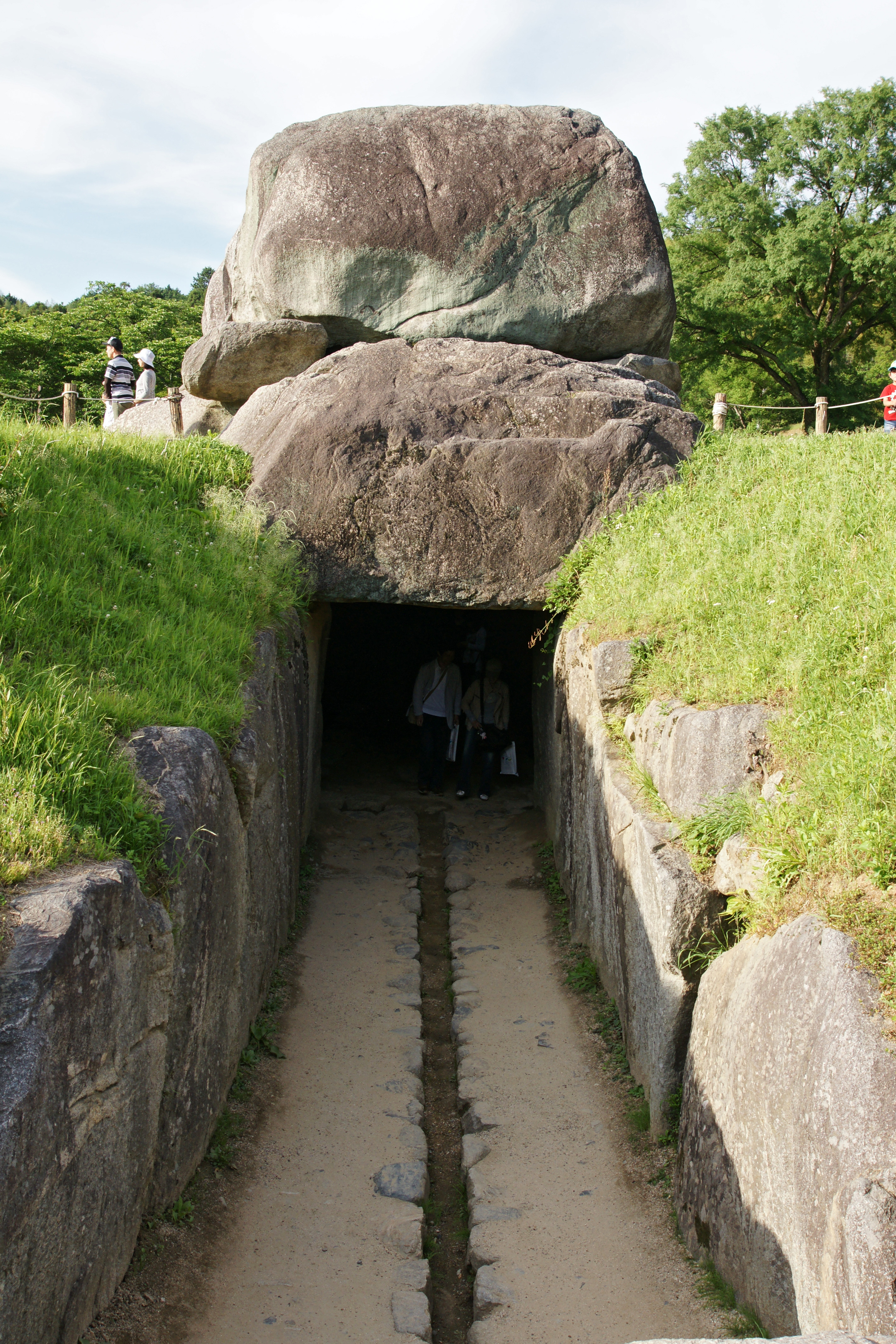
Stone entrance of the Ishibutai Kofun

The Ishibutai Kofun was built on a spur of a mountain that falls northeast to a small plateau. It consists of a platform, a gallery entryway, stone walls that form a burial chamber, two large stones that form a ceiling for the burial chamber, and embankments on either side of the tomb. In total 30 stones were used to construct the Ishibutai Kofun. The large granite megaliths come from Mount Tōnomine, which is approximately 3 kilometers (1.9 mi) from the site.

==== Platform and moat ====
The Ishibutai kofun originally occupied a much larger area than is evidenced by the existing stone tumulus. It was built on a square platform, which measured 50 m (164 ft) on each side at the time of construction. Archeological excavations have revealed that the kofun was surrounded by a moat, a feature typical of other kofun of the period. This moat is estimated to be 12 m (39 ft) wide. In total the kofun, platform, and moat probably covered an area 85 m (279 ft) long.

==== Approach ====
Kofun typically had a stone approach to the entrance path of the tomb. The Ishibutai has a particularly long entrance path, which measures 38 m (125 ft). A shallow drainage channel 11.5 m (38 ft) long and 2.55 m (8 ft) wide runs the length of the entrance path. This entrance was originally covered like the tomb, but its stone ceiling no longer exists.

==== Burial chamber ====
The Ishibutai kofun has a horizontal entry burial chamber opening to the southwest. The inner chamber is 7.5 m (25 ft) long, 3.4 m (11 ft) wide, and 4.8 m (16 ft) high. It consists of 30 stones, 4.7 m (15 ft) by 3.5 m (11 ft) and 7.7 m (25 ft), and the total weight is estimated to be 2,300 tons. Small drainage channels run along the east, north, and west of the tomb. These were constructed to drain water collects on the north side of the tomb to feed south into the shallow drainage channel in the kofun entry.

The Ishibutai kofun is especially noted for the megaliths that form the ceiling of the tomb. The ceiling of the tomb is formed by two megaliths, one to the north and one to the south. The megalith at the north of the tomb weighs approximately 60 t (59 long tons), and the larger stone to the south weighs approximately 77 t (76 long tons).

==== Mound ====
The Ishibutai kofun was originally a large, flat hōfun (方墳) type kofun; the existing stone structure was covered at the time of construction by a broad, flat earthen mound. This mound eroded slowly after the construction of the kofun, thus exposing the large megaliths of the tomb roof.

== Excavation ==
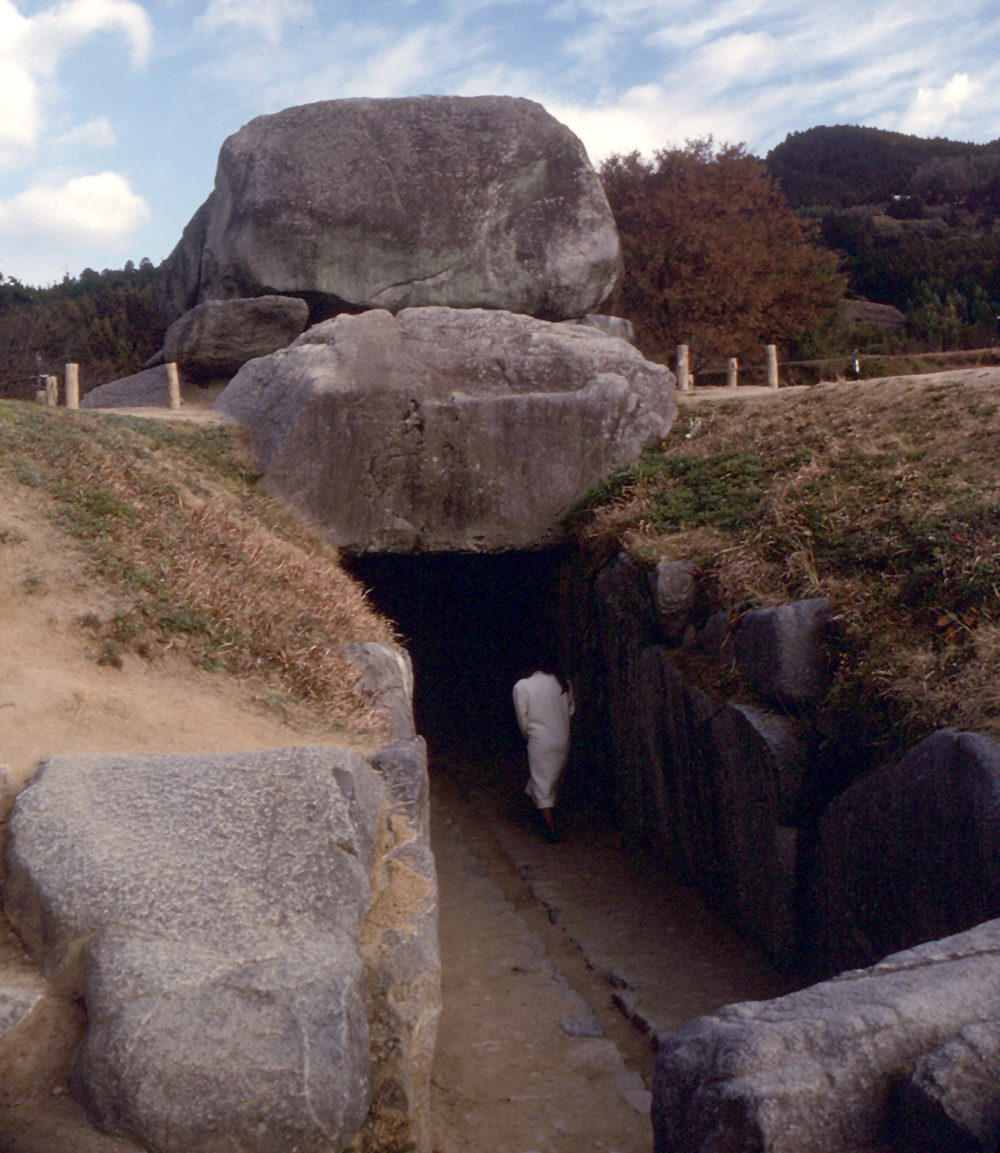
Ishibutai Kofun

The Ishibutai Kofun was first excavated by the archaeologist and academic Kōsaku Hamada (1881－1938). Imperial kofun have not been readily excavated in Japan. Due to its association with Soga no Umako, the Ishibutai tumulus does not have an imperial designation, and has thus seen extensive excavation. The kofun was first excavated in 1933, work on the base and moat began in 1935, and excavation of the tomb continued until 1975.

The Ishibutai Kofun excavation yielded no significant finds. Funerary objects were probably lost to grave robbery quite soon after its construction. Stone shards to the southeast of the tomb are the remains of a tuff sarcophagus. Numerous examples of gilt and bronze implements, as well as earthenware shards were found in the banks of the tomb approach. The excavation also revealed that seven small stone burial chambers once existed to the north and south of the existing structure. Originally thought to have been from baizuka secondary kofun, it is now believed that these were from tombs pre-existing on the site, which were leveled to provide building materials for the Ishibutai Kofun mound.

As excavation of the Ishibutai Kofun continued after World War II, significant reconstruction of areas around the kofun were carried out. A restoration and maintenance project was carried out on the tumulus from 1954 to 1959. At this time, the prefectural road that ran above the tumulus was diverted in order to excavate the outer moat. The kofun and its surrounding area is now part of the Asuka Historical National Government Park.

== Transportation ==
The Ishibutai Kofun is accessible from Asuka Station, which is served by the Kintetsu Yoshino Line. The "Kame Bus" (Tortoise Bus), also called the Asuka Tour Bus/Asuka Circle Route Bus, serves all locations within the Asuka Historical National Government Park, and leaves hourly from Asuka Station. Bicycle rentals are also available at numerous points around the station, and cost approximately 1000 yen a day.

== Gallery ==
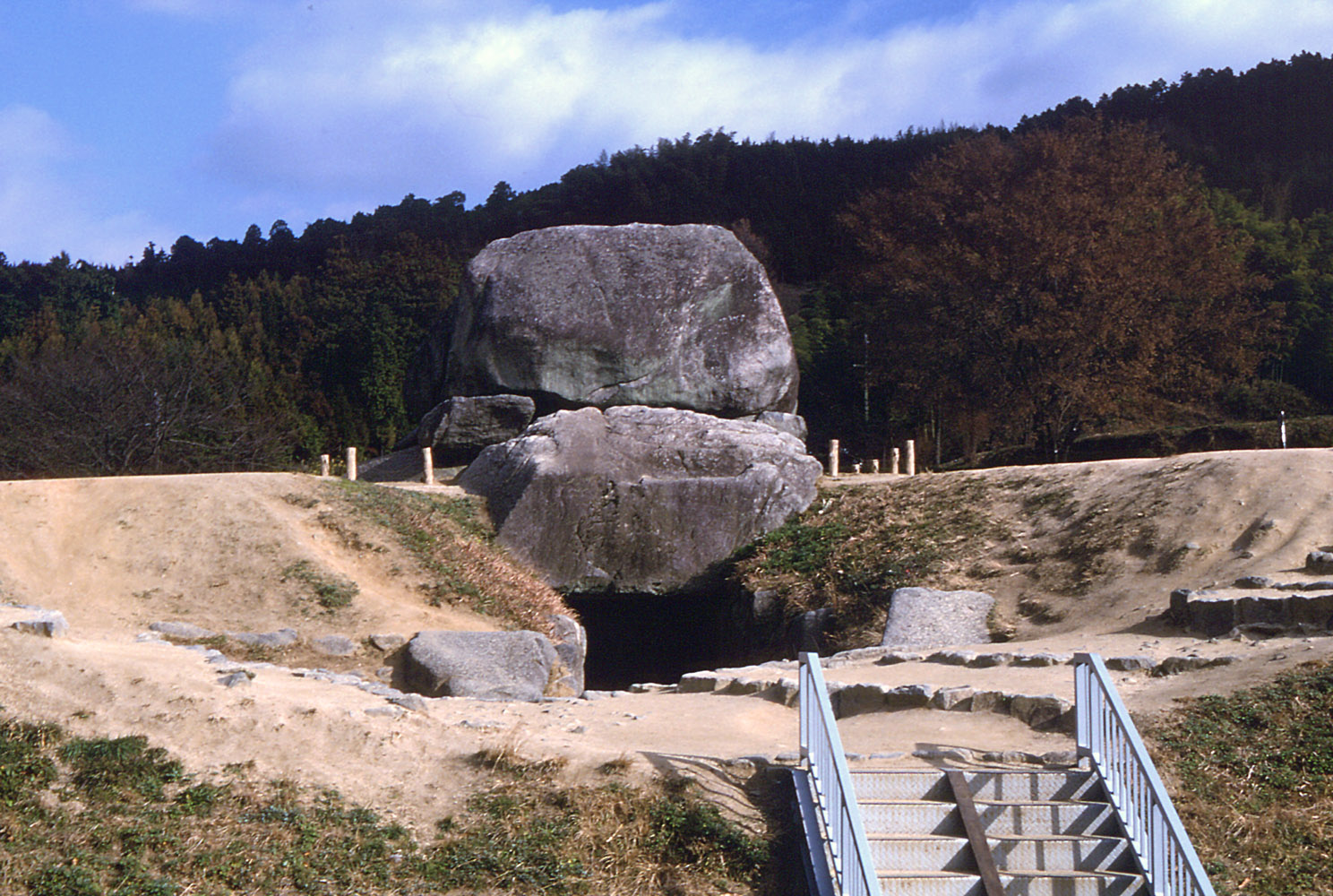
Stairs to Ishibutai Kofun

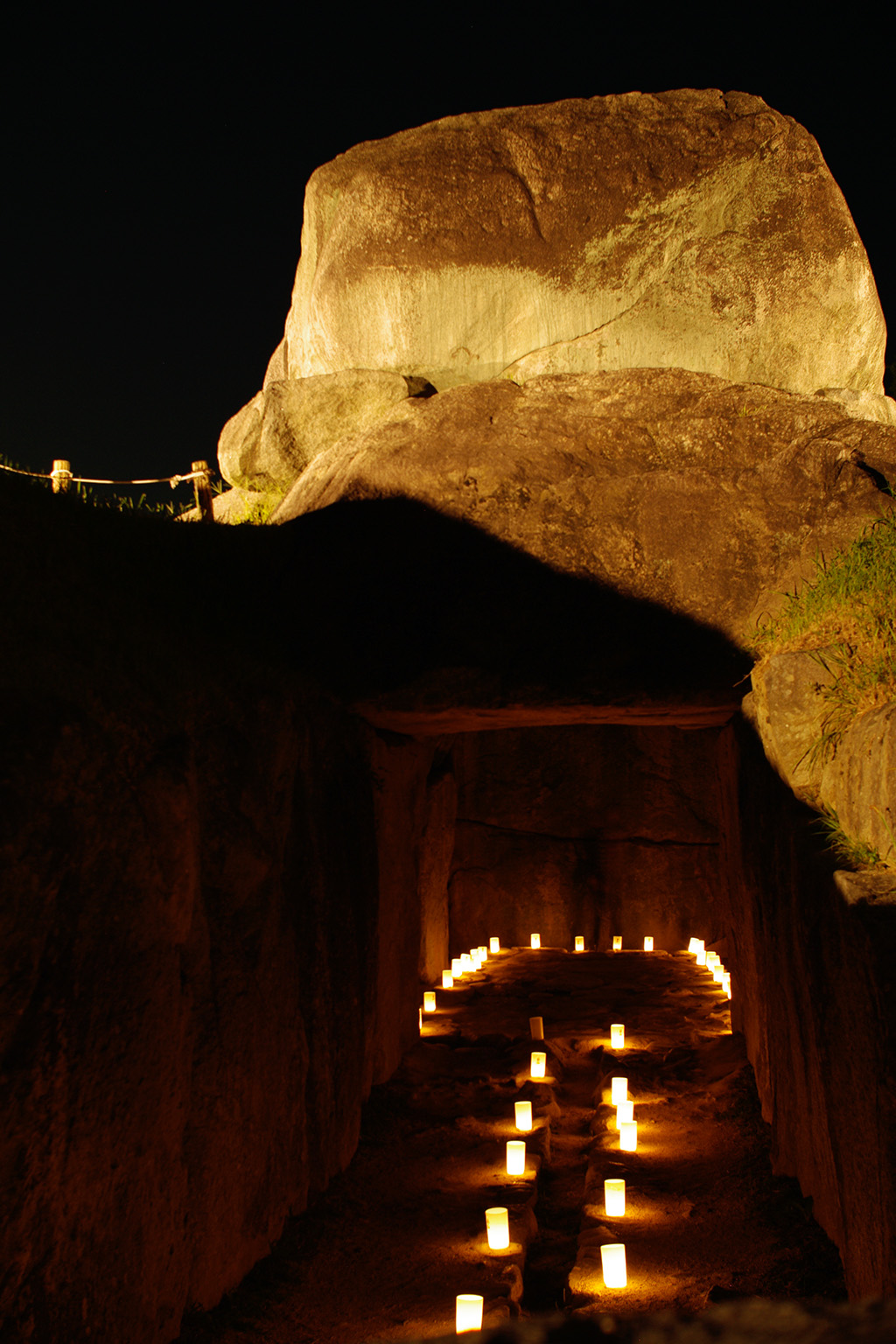
Ishibutai Kofun illuminated in autumn

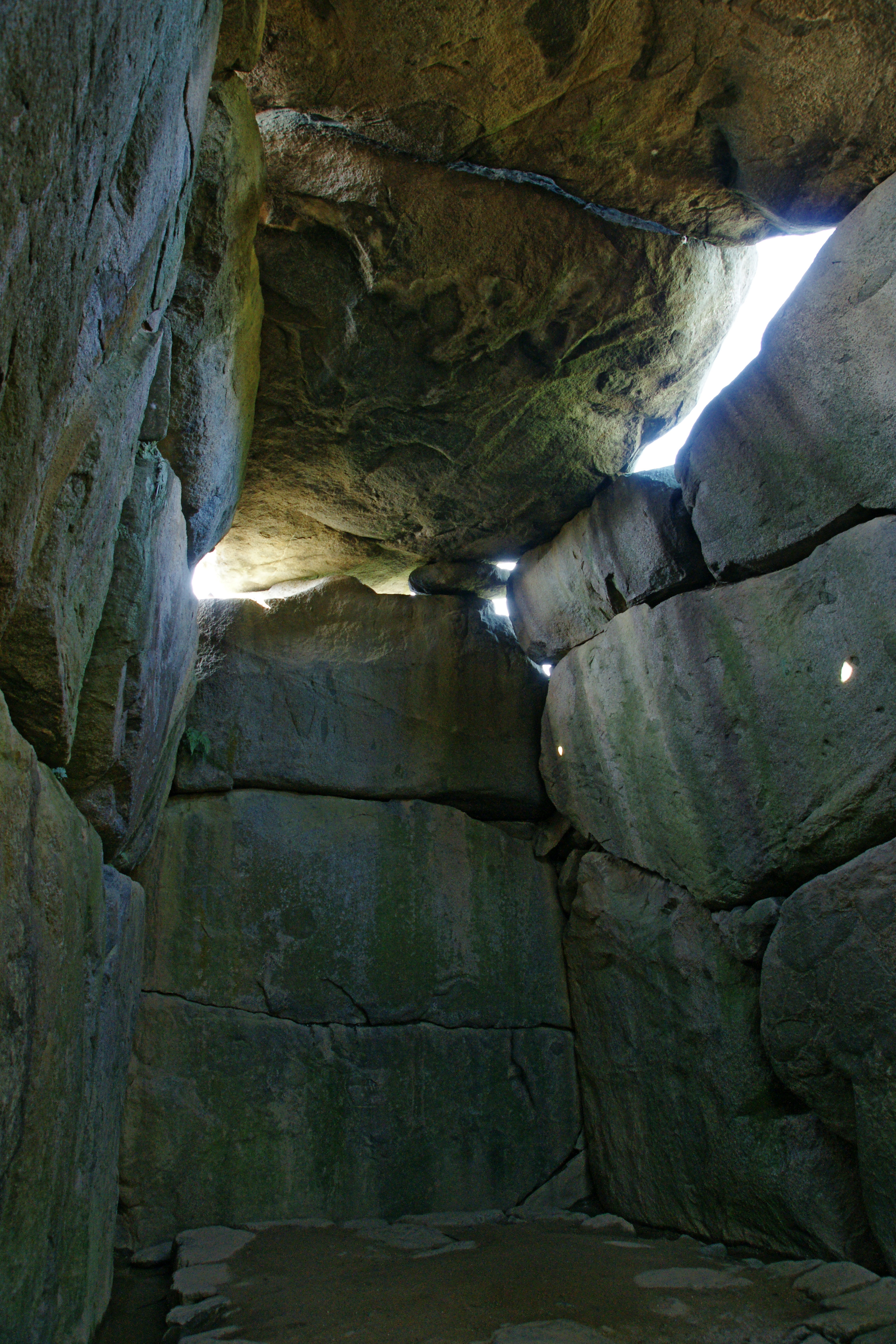
Ceiling of Ishibutai Kofun

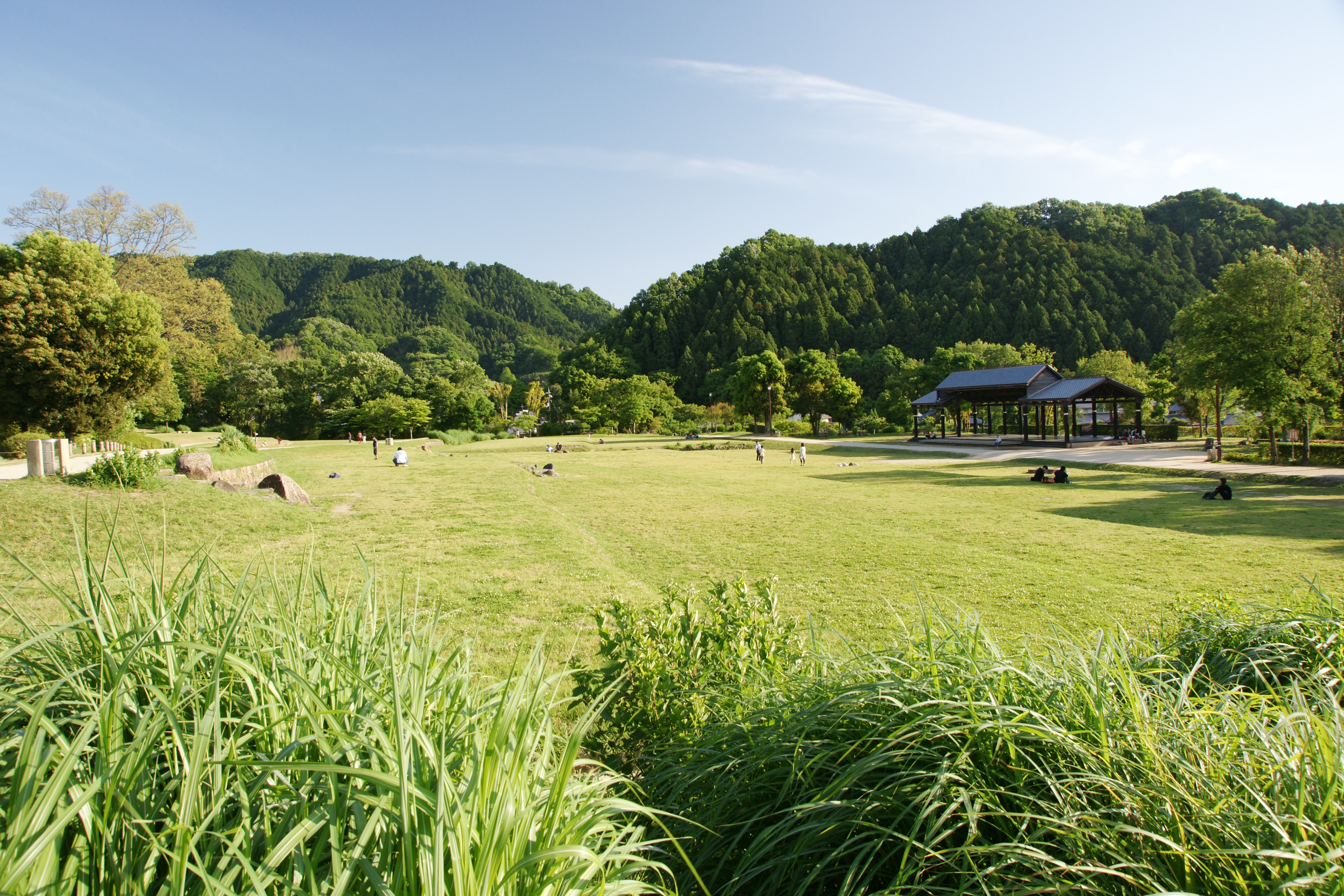
Park surrounding Ishibutai Kofun

== See also ==
- List of megalithic sites
- List of Special Places of Scenic Beauty, Special Historic Sites and Special Natural Monuments
