= Jill Scott (media artist) =

Australian media artist (born 1952)

- Born: 1952 (age 73–74); Melbourne, Australia
- Education: PhD, Center for Advanced Inquiry into the Interactive Arts University of Wales, Great Britain San Francisco State University California, U.S. Art, Design and Education at the University of Melbourne, Melbourne Australia
- Known for: media art, neuroscience, ecology, electronics, performative installations, sculpture
- Movement: media art, interactive art, art and science

Jill Scott (born 1952 in Melbourne) is an Australian media artist who lives in Switzerland. Her works are centered around the topics of Artificial intelligence and the impact of globalization on the human body. She has been living and working in Switzerland as an artist, professor and researcher since 2002. She founded the Artists-in-Labs Residency Program.

== Biography ==
From 1970 to 1973, Jill Scott studied in the Art and Design diploma at the Prahran College of Advanced Education, Melbourne Australia. She received her diploma in pedagogy at the Melbourne Teachers College at the Melbourne University in Australia in 1975. After that, she lived on the west coast, United States where she completed her master's degree in communication at the San Francisco State University California, USA in 1977.

From 1982 to 1992 Scott lived and studied in Australia. She graduated from the Center for Advanced Inquiry into the Interactive Arts, University of Wales, UK. Her dissertation has the title: Digital Body Automata. Exploring the relations between Media, Philosophy and Science.

Since 1992 she has been living in Europe. From 1998 to 2002 she was a professor at the Department of Media at the Bauhaus University Weimar. Since 2003, she has been professor of art and research at the Zurich University of the Arts in Switzerland.

Scott is also vice-director of the Z-node Program, a graduate program in cooperation with the University of Plymouth in Great Britain and co-director and research advisor for the "Artists in labs Residency Program".

== Work ==
Scott has been described as a video, sculpture and performance artist. Her artwork is focused on the human body and neuroscience. She has also worked on artificial intelligence. Her works are archived internationally. In Germany she is represented in the Media Art Network and the Center for Art and Media Karlsruhe. She had her retrospective at the Experimenta Festival in 1996. The works exhibited deal with cognitive processes of the body.

== Exhibitions ==
- 2005: Museum of Contemporary Art (Lucerne, Switzerland), Lucerne, Switzerland
- 2004: Roslyn Oxley Gallery, Sydney, Australia
- 2003: Media Banquet, Barcelona and Muadrid, Spain
- 2002: E-Phos Media Art Festival, Athens, Greece
- 2001: Future Bodies Conference. Cologne, Germany; VIPER New Media Festival, Basel, Switzerland
- 2000: Beyond Hierarchy: Vision Ruhr, Zech Zollern 11, Industrial Museum, Dortmund, Germany
- 1983: Continuum '83, Australian Artists in Japan; Video Gallery SCAN, Tokyo, Japan
- Digital Body Automata. 'WRO Media Festival Fundacia', Warsaw, Poland
- History of the Future. Franklin Furnace Archives, New York, USA

== Books ==
- Artistsinlabs – Recomposing Art and Science. De Gruyter. 2016 (Eds: Jill Scott and Irene Hediger)
- Transdiscourse 2. Turbulence and Reconstruction. De Gruyter. 2015
- Neuromedia. Art and Science Research. Springer. 2012 (Eds: Jill Scott and Esther Stoeckli)
- Artists-in-labs Networking in the Margins. Springer. 2010 (Editor: Jill Scott)
- Transdiscourse Book Series. Mediated Environments. Springer. 2010 (Eds: Jill Scott and Angelika Hillbeck)
- Artists-in-labs Processes of Inquiry. Springer. 2006. (Editor: Jill Scott)
