= Asuka Historical National Government Park =

National government park in Asuka, Japan

- 国営飛鳥歴史公園
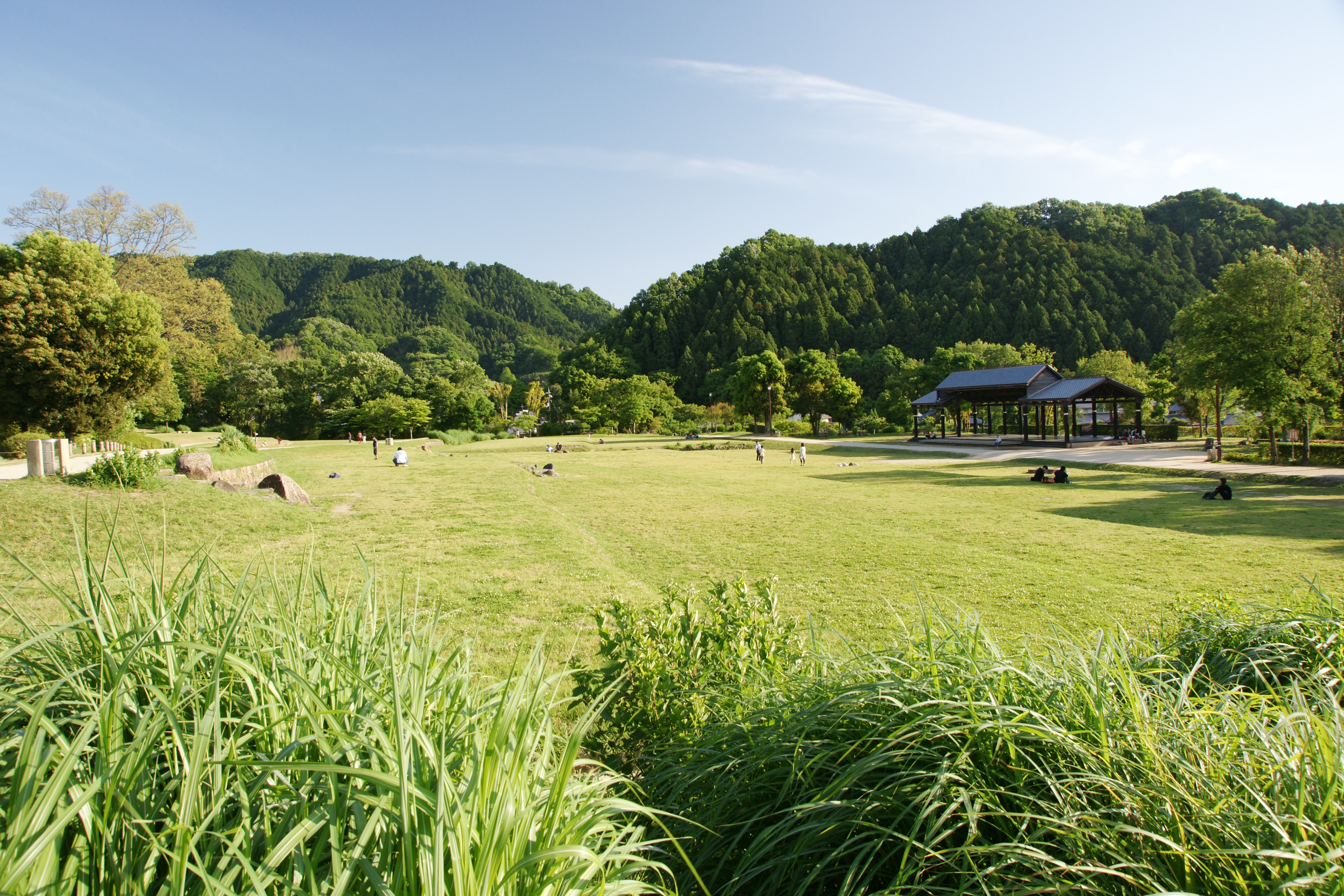
- Environs of Ishibutai Kofun
- Interactive map of Asuka Historical National Government Park
- Location: Asuka, Nara Prefecture, Japan
- Coordinates: 34.4655°N 135.8036°E
- Area: 60 ha (150 acres)
- Established: 1974

Asuka Historical National Government Park (国営飛鳥歴史公園, Kokuei Asuka Rekishi Kōen) is a National Government Park established in Asuka, Nara Prefecture, Japan, in 1974. The park comprises five areas: the Amakashi-no-Oka Area, where there is an observatory with a view over the old capitals of Asuka and Fujiwara-kyō and of Yamato Sanzan; the Iwaido Area, similarly with views to Yamato Sanzan as well as over the terraced rice fields of "Inner Asuka"; the Ishibutai Area; the Takamatsuzuka Area; and the Kitora Tumulus Area.

== See also ==
- Asuka-Fujiwara
- Asuka Historical Museum
