= Makoto Saitō (designer) =

Japanese graphic designer

- サイトウ マコト
- Born: 21 December 1952 (age 73); Fukuoka, Japan
- Occupations: Graphic designer and artist
- Employer: Makoto Saitō Design (owner)

Makoto Saitō (サイトウ マコト; born 21 December 1952) is a Japanese graphic designer, self-described "poster designer", and artist.

Saitō was born in Fukuoka, Japan. He attended Kokura technical high school and started his career after he graduated. His early work as a printmaker was successful, shown internationally, and is part of the collection of the Museum of Modern Art in New York. Saitō worked from 1974 to 1980 at Nippon Design Center before starting his own firm, Makoto Saitō Design. During his time at Nippon Design, he focused mainly on commercial work, where he wanted the poster to reach as many people as possible. early work as a printmaker was successful, shown internationally, and is part of the collection of the Museum of Modern Art in New York. Saitō worked from 1974 to 1980 at Nippon Design Center before starting his own firm, Makoto Saitō Design. His posters are typified by text-free imagery in dense inks printed on thick, high quality papers. His wide-ranging creative activities explore perpetual theme of “seeing.”

That was reflected in an interview with Saitō featured in Spring 2000 issue of Eye magazine, where he was quoted thus:

I don't trust words. You can say anything with words. I prefer a visual means of communication because it allows the message to be more direct.

Saitō has been a member of the Alliance Graphique Internationale since 1994.
