= Peter Callas =

Australian artist, curator and writer

- Born: 30 May 1952; Sydney, Australia
- Education: Sydney College of the Arts, University of Sydney
- Known for: Video art

Peter Callas is an Australian artist, curator and writer, particularly known for his pioneering video art using computer graphics made with the Fairlight CVI (Computer Video Instrument).

== Biography ==
After completing a B.A. at University of Sydney majoring in Fine Arts and Ancient History, Callas worked as an assistant film editor in the Australian Broadcasting Corporation. Callas then studied at Sydney College of the Arts majoring in Printmaking and Sculpture and began making video artworks using performance and image processing, after attending a workshop by Douglas Davis and also seeing the work of Peter Campus for the first time. Callas completed Singing Stone then Our Potential Allies in 1980, based on a book of the same name issued to US troop in Papua New Guinea during WW2. The work won an award in Kobe which allowed Callas to travel to Japan for the first time. He completed a number or artist residencies in Japan and the US in the 1980s including at the Marui Koendori Television/Ring World studio in the Marui Department Store, Tokyo. During 1994-1995 he was artist-in-residence at the ZKM | Center for Art and Media, Karlsruhe.

Key works by Callas include If Pigs Could Fly (The Media Machine) (1987), Night's High Noon: An Anti-Terrain (1988) with music by SPK, the installation Men of Vision: Lenin + Marat (1992), Neo Geo: An American Purchase (1990) with music by Stephen Vitiello and Lost in Translation (1994–99).

He has curated a number of video programs including An Eccentric Orbit: Video Art in Australia 1980 - 1994 which included works by Callas, Philip Brophy, Destiny Deacon, John Gillies, Jill Scott and Bill Seaman, and was shown at the Museum of Modern Art, New York and 15 venues in North America, Asia, Europe and Australia. The programme was divided into three sections: 'The Body Electric', responses to physical and psychological entrapment, and the release from that entrapment through dreams, technology and the imagination; 'Any Resemblance to Reality is Purely Deliberate', 'magical’ construction and deconstruction in or through computer culture; and 'The Diminished Paradise', examining ideas of place and placelessness.

A retrospective of his work, Peter Callas: Initialising History was presented at the Art Gallery of New South Wales in 1999. Screening retrospectives of his video works have been held at the Museum of Modern Art, New York; the Kölnischer Kunstverein, Cologne; the Institute of Contemporary Arts, London; and the Berlin Film Festival. The retrospective, Peter Callas: The Invisible Histories of the Present, at Millenáris Park, Budapest, 2006, was held across two galleries and showed 20 moving images works simultaneously along with a comprehensive collection of his prints. His videos have also been screened on television stations including BBC2, London; Canal +, Paris; SAT.1, Cologne; WGBH-TV, Boston; NHK Satellite, Tokyo; Televisión Española, Madrid; and the ARS TV NETWORK, European Satellite TV Channel, Rome.
