= Spiral (building) =

Coordinates: 35.66368°N 139.71168°E

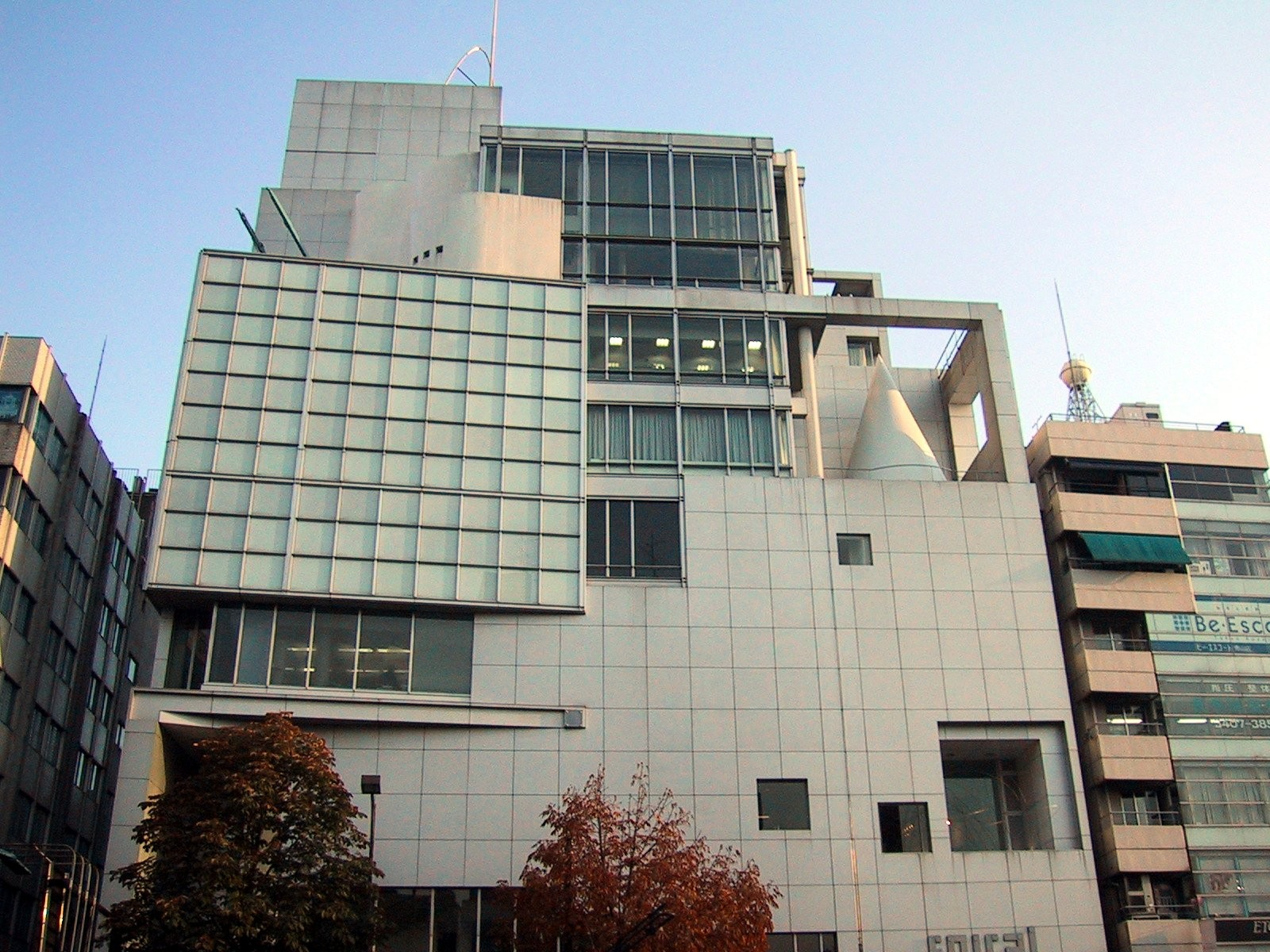
- Spiral exterior
- Interactive map of the Spiral area
- Alternative names: Wacoal Art Center

General information
- Location: Minato, Tokyo, 5-6-23 Minami Aoyama, Japan
- Completed: 1985
- Owner: Wacoal

Design and construction
- Architect: Fumihiko Maki

Website
- www.spiral.co.jp/en

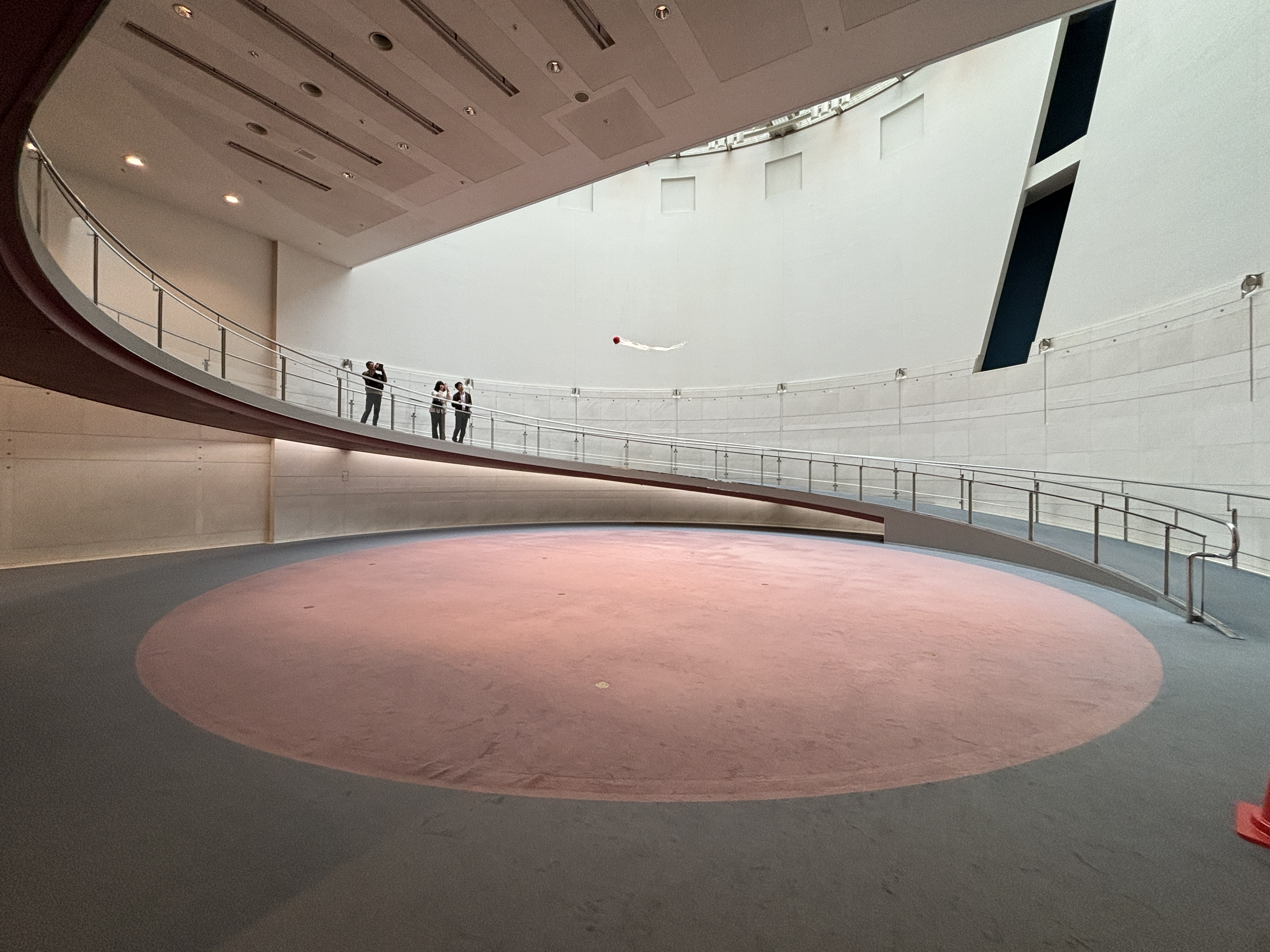
Spiral ramp

Spiral, also known as the Wacoal Art Center, is a multi-use building in Aoyama, Tokyo, Japan, that was designed by architect Fumihiko Maki. It was commissioned by lingerie company Wacoal and completed in 1985.

Spiral includes exhibition spaces, a multipurpose hall, cafes, restaurants and bars, beauty salons, and select shops.

The defining feature of the building is a seemingly-floating spiral ramp (15 m in diameter) that encircles the rear gallery space and climbs to the second floor. The exterior facade of aluminum and glass reflects the jumbled nature of the surrounding streetscape.

The building was selected by the American Institute of Architects for the R.S. Reynolds Memorial Award in 1987. In 2012, the building received the JIA 25 Years Award from the Japan Institute of Architects.

Spiral is a nexus of cultural life in Aoyama, presenting music, art, film, fashion and theater events.

== Sources ==
- Tajima, Noriyuki (1996). Tokyo: A guide to recent architecture. London: Ellipsis.
- "Ellipsis Guide:Tokyo:Spiral". – web version of print source
