= Barbara London (curator) =

American curator and writer

- Born: 1946 (age 79–80); New York, U.S
- Education: Hiram College, Institute of Fine Arts, New York University
- Occupations: Curator, writer, professor
- Organization(s): Curator of Media and Performance Art, The Museum of Modern Art, consultant, Kadist Foundation

Barbara London is a US curator and writer specializing in new media and sound art. She is best known for founding the video collection at the Museum of Modern Art (MoMA), and for the leading acquisition of works by Nam June Paik, Laurie Anderson, Bruce Nauman.

== Career ==
London is the author of Video Art/The First Fifty Years (Phaidon Press, 2020), which traces the history of video art as it transformed into the broader field of media art.

In 2013, London organized and curated Soundings: A Contemporary Score, an investigative exhibition on contemporary sound art that was presented at MoMA. She edited and wrote the catalogue for the exhibition (MoMA, 2013).

London joined MoMA's staff in 1970. As a young Curatorial Assistant in the Department of Prints and Illustrated Books, she founded the video collection and exhibition programs in the mid-1970s, and organized the exhibition Bookworks in 1977.

At MoMA, she organized more than 500 cutting edge media art exhibitions showcasing the work of pioneering artists active internationally. She also initiated Video Viewpoints (1978–2002), a four-year lecture series in which media artists regularly presented and discussed their work.

In 1992, she was an author on a collaborative book titled Jean-Luc Godard: son + image, 1974 -1991. The book was published by MoMA.

In 1997, London pioneered one of the first multimedia museum websites, Stir-Fry.A series of curatorial dispatches from China, the site was among the first publications to map the emerging field of Chinese media art.

After four decades as curator of media and performance art at MoMA, in 2013 she changed hats to write, curate, and teach at the Yale School of Art. She is a consultant to the Kadist interdisciplinary contemporary arts foundation.

In 2023, she curated Perpetual Motion, an online collective show organized for Pérez Art Museum Miami's PAMMTV, a new time-based media art streaming platform founded by PAMM. This was London's first curatorial project for an on-demand platform.

== Exhibitions ==
- Sound Art (1979)
- Video Spaces: Eight Installations (1995)
- Music and Media (2004)
- Anime!! (2005)
- Automatic Update (2007)
- Looking at Music (2008)
- Looking at Music: Side 2 (2010)
- Looking at Music 3.0 (2011)
- Soundings: A Contemporary Score (2013)
- Tokyo 1955–1970 (2013)
- Seeing Sound (2020-2024)
- Perpetual Motion (2023-2024), Pérez Art Museum Miami's PAMMTV

== Bibliography ==
- London, Barbara. Video/Art: The First Fifty Years, (2020). Phaidon Press. ISBN 978-0714877594.
- London, Barbara; Stone, Jim; Upton, John (2016). Photography (12th ed.). Pearson. ISBN 978-0134482026.
