= Idemitsu (disambiguation) =

Idemitsu Kosan is a Japanese petroleum company

Idemitsu (出光) may also refer to:

- Idemitsu Museum of Arts, an art museum in Tokyo, Japan

== People with the surname ==
- Mako Idemitsu (born 1940), Japanese artist
- Sazō Idemitsu (1885–1981), founder, Idemitsu Kosan
