= Nghi Sơn Refinery =

Second planned oil refinery in Vietnam

Nghi Son Refinery
- Cooperate logo

- Location within Vietnam
- Location: Thanh Hóa, Vietnam; 19°20′32″N 105°47′52″E

Refinery details
- Operator: NSRP LLC
- Owners: Petrovietnam, Idemitsu Kosan, Kuwait Petroleum International, Mitsui Chemicals
- Capacity: 200,000 barrels per day (32,000 m^{3}/d)
- Website: https://nsrp.vn/

Nghi Sơn Refinery, formally cooperated as Nghi Son Refinery and Petrochemical LLC (NSRP; Công ty TNHH Lọc hóa dầu Nghi Sơn), is the second oil refinery in Vietnam. It is located about 200 kilometres (120 mi) south of Hanoi in Tinh Gia District of Thanh Hóa Province. Site-clearing for the project broke ground in 2008. Construction began on 23 October 2013, and refinery operations were targeted for 2017. Planned capacity is 200,000 barrels per day (32,000 m^{3}/d), slightly greater than that of Vietnam's first Dung Quat refinery. The site-clearing phase entailed the resettlement of 350 households with 1,500 people and the surface leveling of the area.

== Technical features ==
Nghi Son refinery would have a designed capacity of 10 million tons of crude oil per year with possibility to increase the capacity to 20 million tons. It is expected to cost US$9 billion. The refinery project will also include petrochemical complex, energy facilities, pipeline and storage systems. In addition to LPG, unleaded gasoline, kerosene, jet fuel, diesel and FO, the refinery is projected to produce bitumen, propylene and BTX as a raw material for the petrochemical industry.

The refinery will be supplied with crude oil imports from Kuwait.

== Construction ==
The refinery was designed and built by a syndicate of EPC contractors including JGC Corporation and Chiyoda Corporation from Japan, GS Engineering & Construction Corporation and SK Engineering & Construction Co. from South Korea, Technip from France and Malaysia's Technip Geoproduction. 70% of the construction costs will be financed through the Japan Bank for International Cooperation. According to Bloomberg, JGC won the EPC contract to build the refinery in 2011.

== Consortium ==
The project was developed by a consortium of international companies. Petrovietnam holds 25.1%, Idemitsu Kosan and Kuwait Petroleum International each hold a 35.1% share and Mitsui Chemicals has the remaining 4.7% of shares. A contract to set up a joint venture was signed on 7 April 2008.

== Operations ==
The refinery began its first production of MOGAS 92 in May 2018, it started commercial operations in mid-November 2018.

== See also ==
- Dung Quat Refinery
- Long Son Refinery
