= Philosophical Association of Japan =

- 日本哲学会
- Abbreviation: PAJ
- Formation: 1949 (69 years ago)
- Purpose: Academic
- Members: 1,400
- President: Katō Yasushi
- Website: http://philosophy-japan.org

The Philosophical Association of Japan (日本哲学会, Nippon Tetsugakukai; PAJ) is the largest learned society for philosophy in Japan. The purpose of the association is to "promote the study of philosophy and active interaction among researchers from philosophy, working as a forum to discuss on research, education and the role of philosophy in the modern world." The association was founded by Japanese philosophers in 1949, with Amano Teiyū (September 30, 1884 – March 6, 1980) being elected its first president. Since 1952, the association has published the journal Philosophy (哲学, Tetsugaku) annually, with Volume 69 releasing in April 2018.

== History ==
The PAJ was founded in 1949 by Japanese philosophers, with Amano Teiyū being elected its first president. Beginning in 1952, mainly through the efforts of presidents Amano, Ide Takashi (March 10, 1892 – March 9, 1980), Shimomura Toratarō (August 17, 1902 – January 22, 1995), Mutai Risaku (August 8, 1880 – July 5, 1974), and Watsuji Tetsurō (1889 – 1960), the first edition of the association's journal Philosophy (哲学, Tetsugaku) was published "with the primary purpose of offering occasions for the exchange of opinions and information about research in philosophy inside and outside of Japan".

== Activities ==
- Annual conference
  - The PAJ organizes a three-day conference during which it hosts oral presentations, a general symposium, a "societies symposium", international sessions, joint research workshops, PAJ working group workshops, and the general assembly. It most recently held the 77th conference on May 18–20, 2018 at Kobe University.
- Publications:
1. Tetsugaku (Philosophy): Annual Review of the Philosophical Association of Japan
2. Tetsugaku: International Journal of the Philosophical Association of Japan
3. The Gate of Philosophy: Journal for Graduate Students
- Working groups
  - The PAJ organizes three "working groups" concerning gender equality and support for young philosophers, education on philosophy, and the international exchange of research.
- Awards and Grants
  - The PAJ has established the annual PAJ Young Researcher Award and the Hayashi Foundation Grants for Young Researchers with the aim of encouraging young researchers and developing philosophical research within Japan.

== Presidents ==
Names and terms served of all past PAJ presidents:

#	Name	Term
1	Teiyū Amano	December 1949 - March 1950
2	Risaku Mutai	April 1950 - March 1953
3	Kichinosuke Itō	April 1953 - March 1956
4	Takashi Ide	April 1956 - March 1958
5	Juichi Katsura	April 1958 - March 1960
6	Gōichi Miyake	April 1960 - March 1964
7	Juichi Katsura	April 1964 - March 1966
8	Masao Matsumoto	April 1966 - March 1968
9	Toratarō Shimomura	April 1968 - April 1969
10	Masakazu Yamazaki	May 1969 - April 1973
11	Takeo Iwasaki	May 1973 - October 1976
12	Masakazu Yamazaki	November 1976 - April 1977
13	Nobushige Sawada	February 1977 - March 1982
14	Makoto Yamamoto	April 1982 - April 1987
15	Norio Fujisawa	May 1987 - June 1991
16	Jirō Watanabe	July 1991 - June 1995
17	Megumi Sakabe	July 1995 - May 1999
18	Hisatake Katō	June 1999 - May 2003
19	Keiichi Noe	June 2003 - May 2007
20	Mamoru Takayama	June 2007 - May 2011
21	Takashi Iida	May 2011 - May 2015
22	Yasushi Katō	May 2015 - Incumbent
