= Millisecond furnace =

Oil refining device

A Millisecond Furnace is a device used for cracking naphtha into ethylene, by extremely short (50 to 100 millisecond) exposure to temperatures of about 900 °C (1,650 °F), followed by a rapid quenching below 750 °C (1,380 °F).

It was developed by M. W. Kellogg and Idemitsu in the 1970s.
