= Mohammad Saifur Rohman =

Indonesian cardiologist and academic

- Born: Mohammad Saifur Rohman; 23 October 1968 (age 58); Pasuruan, East Java, Indonesia
- Citizenship: Indonesian
- Education: University of Brawijaya; Kobe University; University of Indonesia
- Known for: Vice Dean for Academic Affairs, Faculty of Medicine, University of Brawijaya (2023–2028); President Director of Universitas Brawijaya Hospital (2025–present)
- Scientific career
- Fields: Cardiology; Interventional cardiology
- Workplaces: University of Brawijaya; Dr. Saiful Anwar General Hospital

Mohammad Saifur Rohman (born 23 October 1968) is an Indonesian interventional cardiologist and professor at the Faculty of Medicine, University of Brawijaya (FK UB). He serves as Vice Dean for Academic Affairs at FK UB and President Director of Universitas Brawijaya Hospital (RSUB).

== Early life and education ==
Saifur was born in Pasuruan, East Java, on 23 October 1968. He earned his medical degree from the University of Brawijaya in 1995. He later completed a Doctor of Philosophy (Ph.D.) in molecular cardiology at Kobe University in Japan in 2005 and a specialization in cardiology and vascular medicine at the University of Indonesia in 2010, followed by subspecialty training in interventional cardiology.

== Career ==
Saifur joined the Department of Cardiology and Vascular Medicine at the University of Brawijaya and practiced at Dr. Saiful Anwar General Hospital in Malang. On 20 November 2019, he was inaugurated as a full professor of cardiology and vascular medicine at the University of Brawijaya, delivering an inaugural lecture on genetics-based prevention and management of acute coronary syndrome.

In Malang, he initiated community cardiovascular screening and heart attack care networks, including the Malang Cardiovascular Care and telemedicine electrocardiogram programs for primary health centers. During the COVID-19 pandemic, he also led clinical research on cardiovascular complications and secondary prevention protocols.

In February 2023, Saifur was appointed Vice Dean for Academic Affairs at FK UB for the 2023–2028 term. In that capacity, he has represented the faculty in national medical education and specialist residency initiatives. He was subsequently appointed President Director of Universitas Brawijaya Hospital.
