= Dung Quất Refinery =

Oil refinery in Vietnam

Dung Quat refinery
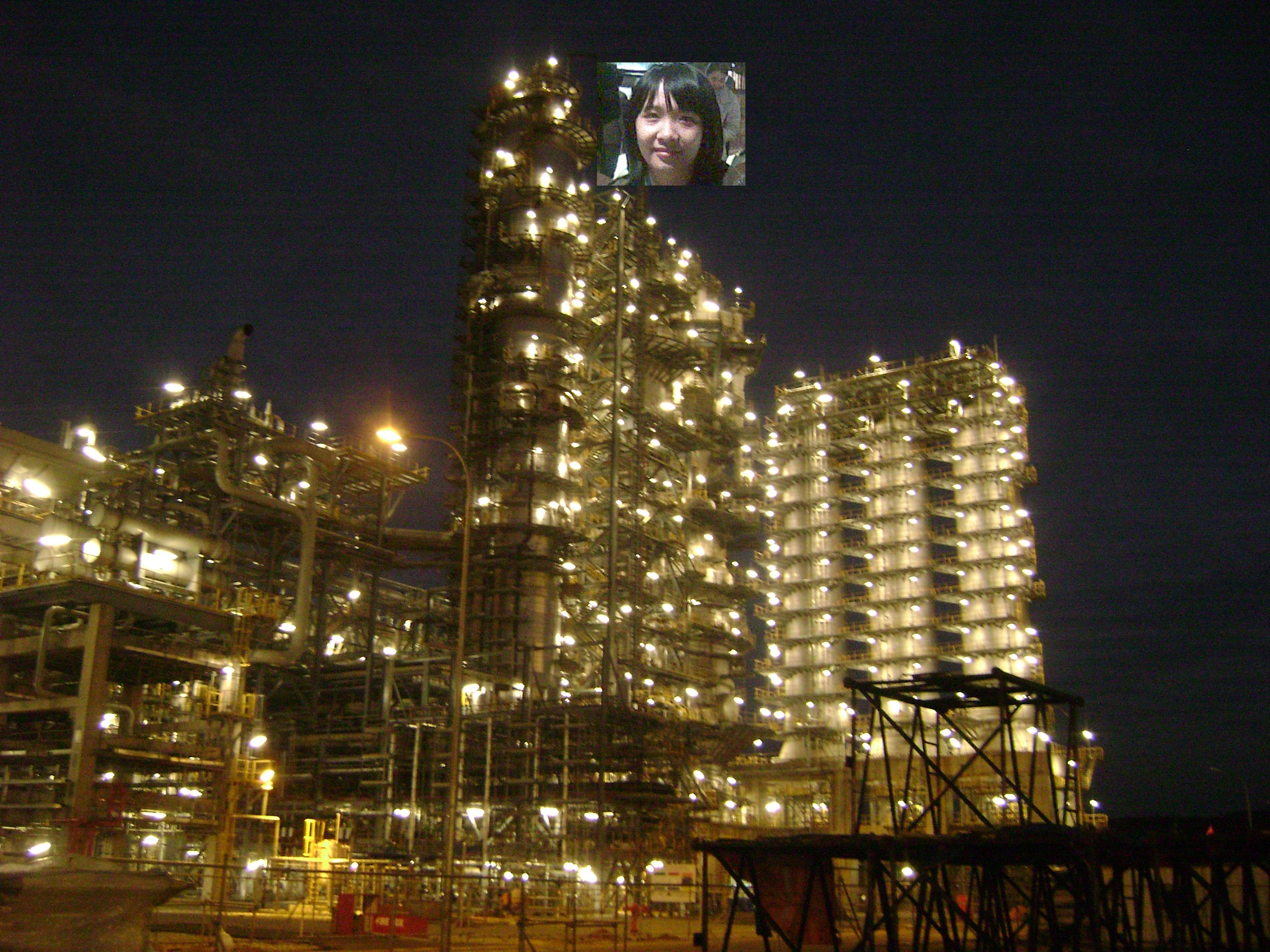

- Location within Vietnam
- Location: Quảng Ngãi, Vietnam; 15°21′9″N 108°49′47″E

Refinery details
- Operator: BSR
- Owner: Petrovietnam
- Opened: 2009
- Capacity: 140,000 barrels per day (22,000 m^{3}/d)

The Dung Quất refinery, operating under Binh Son Refining and Petrochemical JSC (BSR; CTCP Lọc hóa dầu Bình Sơn), is an oil refinery in Quảng Ngãi Province, Vietnam. It is the first oil refinery in Vietnam.

== History ==
The refinery project started already in 1980s. The refinery was planned to be construct near the port of Vũng Tàu, just 100 kilometers (60 mi) away from the offshore oil fields. In 1988, the clearance of the construction site from unexploded wartime ordnance was started. However, in 1991 the refinery project was shelved. In the early 1990s, Total S.A. expressed interest to the project. At the same time the Vietnamese government suggested to move the site to Van Phong bay, north of Nha Trang, and later further north to Dung Quat. Followed this, in 1995 Total SA pulled out, claiming that the new site made no economic sense. Total was replaced with a consortium of foreign investors, including LG Group and Petronas, but also this consortium withdraw two years later.

In 1998, the establishment of VietRoss, a joint venture of Vietnam and Russia, was decided. The intergovernmental agreement on the construction and operation of the refinery was signed on 25 August 1998. The Front End Engineering Design (FEED) Contract was signed between PetroVietnam, Zarubezhneft and Foster Wheeler Energy. The Dung Quat Refinery was originally scheduled to start work in 2000, but the process was several times delayed. On 25 December 2002, the intergovernmental agreement between Vietnam and Russia was terminated, and the project continued as a solo project of Petrovietnam.

On 24 October 2003, the project management consultancy services contract was signed with Stone & Webster, and on 27 February 2004 the contract for front end engineering design (FEED) development was signed with Technip. The construction started on 28 November 2005. The refinery was inaugurated by Vietnamese Prime Minister Nguyễn Tấn Dũng on 22 February 2009. In the same year, industrial gross output in Quang Ngai Province increased by 144.7% and the share of industry in the province's GDP surged from 36.2% in 2008 to 46.3% in 2009.

On 16 August 2009, refinery's operations were suspended due to a "technical repair" in the residue fluid catalytic cracking unit. The unit was expected to be repaired by 9–10 September 2009.

== Technical features ==
Dung Quat refinery has a designed capacity of 6.5 million tons of crude oil annually, or 140 thousand barrels per day (22×10^{3} m^{3}/d). The capacity would be expanded to 10 million tons per year by 2013–2014. In addition to fuels, the refinery will also produce petro-chemical products. The refinery complex area comprises:

- Overall Refinery Process, Utility and Offsites Facilities: about 110 ha;
- Crude Tank Farm and Flare Area: about 42 ha;
- Product Tank Farm: about 36 ha;
- Seawater intake, Waste Water and Crude Oil Pipelines: about 4 ha;
- Interconnecting Pipelines, road and right of Way: about 40 ha;
- Product Harbor Service Area: about 135 ha.

Main contractors of the refinery were Technip, JGC Corporation, and Técnicas Reunidas. The refinery cost US$3 billion, up from $2.5 billion previously and more than double an original cost estimate of about $1.4 billion in 1994. It may need another $1 billion to build a desulphurising unit targeted for 2013.

== Source of supply ==
The refinery is outfitted to process oil from Bạch Hổ oil field, which is expected to run dry before 2020. Petrovietnam has a preliminary agreement with BP for supplies of similar quality to use exclusively until 2011.

== Ownership ==
The refinery is owned and operated by Petrovietnam. Petrovietnam negotiates with foreign oil companies, including Royal Dutch Shell, Essar Group and SK Energy, to upgrade and sell part of the refinery.

== Controversy ==
Critics of the project claim that the refinery is non-feasible, and the location is chosen for political, not economical reasons, as most of oil comes from offshore fields in Southern Vietnam.

== See also ==
- Nghi Sơn Refinery
- Long Son Refinery
