= Hokkaido Refinery =

Oil refinery in Japan

Hokkaido Refinery is the northernmost oil refinery in Japan, located in Tomakomai, Hokkaido, Japan. The refinery began operations in 1973 to supply regions in northern Japan. It is operated by Idemitsu Kosan.It began operations in 1973 as a base for supplying energy to Hokkaido, Tohoku, Hokuriku, and other areas.

== 2003 fires ==
Following the 2003 Hokkaido earthquake, a major fire started in the naphtha storage tank. It burned for almost 34 hours before being put out. A second fire started because of aftershocks caused by the massive earthquake. Refinery workers found damage in 29 of the refinery's oil tanks.

== Increase in oil supply ==
In October 2013 Idemitsu Kosan said they will increase the oil supply in the Hokkaido Refinery by February 2014, after declaring they are shutting down the Tokuyama refinery.
