= Mako Idemitsu =

Japanese experimental media artist

- Born: 1940 (age 85–86); Tokyo, Imperial Japan
- Occupation: Artist
- Years active: 1970–present
- Spouse: Sam Francis (1966–1985)
- Children: Osamu Francis, Shingo Francis
- Website: makoidemitsu.com

Mako Idemitsu (出光 真子, Idemitsu Mako; born 1940, Tokyo, Japan) is a Japanese experimental media artist whose work includes films, videos, and installations. Her work examines gender roles, domestic life, and female identity within Japanese society.

== Early life ==
Mako Idemitsu was born in Ōta, Tokyo, Japan. Her father, Sazō Idemitsu, was a Japanese businessman, art collector, and founder of Idemitsu Kosan. Traditional gender expectations during her upbringing contributed to tensions with her father. Her decision to study abroad and pursue an artistic career led to conflicts with him, resulting in her disinheritance.

In her autobiography, Idemitsu writes that her father’s traditional views limited her and her family's independence.

Idemitsu attended Waseda University in Tokyo from 1958 to 1962, studying Japanese history. She subsequently attended Columbia University in New York City from 1963 to 1964 and resided in the United States, primarily in California, from 1963 to 1972. In later interviews and writings, Idemitsu described her undergraduate experience as restrictive and cited what she perceived as sexist attitudes among some faculty. She engaged in extracurricular activities, including membership in the university's Contemporary Literature Society, and participated in student demonstrations against the 1960 U.S.–Japan Security Treaty.

== Personal life ==
Idemitsu has two sisters; one of them, Takako, was a painter once married to art critic Yoshiaki Tōno. She has two sons from her marriage with Sam Francis, named Osamu and Shingo, the latter also eventually becoming a painter.

=== New York and California ===
From 1963 to 1964, Idemitsu attended Columbia University in New York City. In her autobiography, she writes that she appreciated the multicultural environment of New York and the autonomy she experienced there.

Around 1965, she moved to California, living in Santa Monica and Los Angeles, where she remained until 1972. In 1965, she married painter Sam Francis, becoming his fourth wife.

Her time in California exposed her to the counterculture of the 1960s. She later noted that gendered biases and male chauvinism persisted in these environments. She was associated with Womanhouse (1972), an art installation and performance project founded by Judy Chicago and Miriam Schapiro, marking the beginning of her engagement with the Women's Liberation Movement.

=== Tokyo ===
Idemitsu returned to Japan with Francis and their sons in 1973, originally intending to remain for one year. Francis returned to the United States in 1974, while Idemitsu remained in Japan. The couple later divorced, and Francis remarried in 1985. After returning to Japan, she produced her At Santa Monica (1973-5) and At Any Place (1975-8) series, in which she makes use of and reflects on her earlier photographs taken in the United States.

Upon returning to Tokyo, Idemitsu established her video practice independently, while partnering with other video artists such as the members of Video Hiroba. She learned video production techniques with assistance from Nobuhiro Kawanaka and Kyōko Michishita. Michael Goldberg, a frequent collaborator who co-organized the Video Communication/Do It Yourself Kit symposium and exhibition, is credited as director of photography on many of her videos. Idemitsu also worked with Yoshimitsu Takahashi on her films. In the broader Japanese art scene, she collaborated with Yoneyama Mamako on At Any Place 4 (1978), after seeing her pantomime Housewife’s Tango. Idemitsu was involved with Japanese art historians, particularly Kaori Chino, a feminist art historian who encouraged her to write and publish her autobiography.

== Art ==
=== Medium ===
The technical limitations of the equipment at the time influenced the direction of Idemitsu's work. She first started to work in the United States, initially with 8 mm film, and then moved to 16 mm film. She became interested in capturing the mood, quality, and interplay of light and shadow. After switching from film to video, technical limitations of early video cameras encouraged a greater emphasis on narrative elements in her work. On her return to Japan, the cumbersome equipment and an inability to easily film outdoors led her to use indoor single-camera setups. Idemitsu also produced a limited number of video installations. Critics have noted that Idemitsu’s work draws on narrative techniques associated with melodrama and diary narration. Critics such as Scott Nygren have attempted to locate Japanese cultural origins within her work, claiming a similarity between her narrative form and that of Noh theatre.

=== Themes ===
Idemitsu's work often incorporates feminist perspectives. Her art explores themes of gender roles, personal identity, and the construction of the self within societal frameworks. In particular, she critically examines the role of the modern Japanese family, highlighting how its traditional structure can contribute to the suppression of women's identities. Idemitsu cites Simone de Beauvoir as a major influence. Idemitsu's work, Kae, Act like a Girl (1993), was inspired by de Beauvoir's statement in The Second Sex that "People are not born as women. They become women." Idemitsu also explores aspects of Japanese womanhood, including depictions of domestic abuse, harassment, and rape. Idemitsu's early films include home movies of her sons and family life. This domestic setting remains a consistent theme in her films. A recurring motif in her works is disembodied forms; the television abstracting torsos, heads, or even eyes. These disembodied characters, usually female, may act indifferent to their protagonists or may actively oppress them. They can be interpreted both at face value as the mother, daughter, or wife of the protagonist or as a representation of their inner mind. For example, in Idemitsu's Great Mother trilogy, the disembodied women who represent the protagonist's mothers also represent the super-ego of the protagonist, personifying inescapable learned cultural values and societal norms.

== Notable works ==
=== Film and video ===
==== What a Woman Made (1973) ====
In What a Woman Made, a close up image of a tampon swirling in a toilet bowl slowly appears. Meanwhile, Idemitsu speaks about the roles, responsibilities, and expectations of women, which provides a critique of women's treatment in Japanese society.

==== Sam Are You Listening? (1974) ====
Commissioned by the American Center Japan, this hour-long documentary video presents an intimate portrayal of Idemitsu's then-husband, Sam Francis. Idemitsu interviewed five people about how they viewed Francis: Taeko Tomioka, Toru Takemitsu, Shuzo Takiguchi, Jiro Takamatsu, and Sazo Idemitsu.

==== Another Day of A Housewife (1977) ====
This video explores Idemitsu's own frustrations with the routine of house chores. Idemitsu portrays frustration with alienation and surveillance by interrupting each domestic scene with a televisual eye.

==== Shadow Part 1 (1980) & Part 2 (1980), Animus Part 1 (1982) & Part 2 (1982) ====
The Shadow and Animus series explores Jungian psychological concepts within domestic scenes: the personification of dreams, projections of mental imagery, and the difficulty of living under oppressive patriarchy. This series builds upon Idemitsu's earlier work, Inner-man (1972), which was shot on film.

==== My America, Your America (1980) ====
Idemitsu uses photographs by her collaborator, Akira Kobayashi, to construct a found-image video. Idemitsu balances images of Americana to suggest the journey of a foreigner through these iconic landscapes, searching for a place within them to belong. It reflects upon her own experiences moving from coast to coast.

==== Kiyoko's Situation (1989) ====
The film Kiyoko's Situation depicts Kiyoko, a middle-aged housewife, whose repressed desire to express her identity emerges. Idemitsu portrays the struggle for housewives to be filial, care for their family's needs, and pursue their own creative ambitions. This film received awards from the Mention Special du Jury category "EXPERIMENTAL," La Mondiale de film et videos Quebec, Canada in 1991, and Prix Procirep Section Fiction, Festival International de Videos et Films, Centre Audiovisuels Simone de Beauvoir, Paris, France, in 1992.

=== Installations ===
==== Still Life (1993–2000) ====
Still Life is a two-channel video installation with moving images projected onto two gigantic calla lilies placed side by side. On one lily, hands pull the petals off a red rose. On the second, the pistil is missing. A woman is shown imprisoned behind an invisible, transparent wall, appearing to plead for release. A woman's voice-over endlessly repeats "Have a good day" and "Welcome home", echoing the perceived monotony of a housewife's existence.

==== Real? Motherhood (2000) ====
Real? Motherhood is an installation that critically examines the myth of maternity. The single-channel installation repurposes Idemitsu's 1960s home movies, projecting images through a glass cradle. The moving images show Idemitsu holding one of her children, a baby suckling, mother and child looking at each other, and the baby's innocent smile. These are interspersed with black-and-white images of the ambiguous expression on the mother's face. Light falling from above onto the glass cradle conveys an impression of sanctity; the cradle is transmuted, for the mother, into an altar. However, Idemitsu suggests that this Western type of cradle also resembles a coffin, symbolizing mortality.

=== Literary work ===
- What a Woman Made: Autobiography of a Filmmaker (ホワット·ア·うーまんめいど: ある映像作家の自伝 / Howatto a ūman meido: Aru eizō sakka no jiden), Iwanami Shoten (岩波書店), 2003.
- White Elephant, Chin Music Press (translation by Juliet Winters Carpenter), 2016, based on Idemitsu's life.

== Selected exhibitions and screenings ==
- 1974 Nirenoki Gallery, Ginza, Japan. Idemitsu's first solo exhibition
- 1974 "New York Tokyo Video Express" (Curated by Shigeko Kubota), Tenjō sajiki, Tokyo, Japan
- 1978 "International Video Festival", Sogetsu-kaikan, Tokyo, Japan
- 1978 "Japan Video Art Festival" (Curated by Jorge Glusberg), Centro de Arte y Comunicación, Buenos Aires, Argentina
- 1979 "Video from Tokyo, Fukui and Kyoto" (Curated by Barbara London), The Museum of Modern Art, New York, US
- 1979 "Japan Avant Garde Film Exhibition", The Centre Georges Pompidou, Paris, France
- 1992 "Centre Audiovisuel Simone de Beauvoir International Festival Video and Films", Paris, France. Idemitsu was influenced by de Beauvoir.
- 1993 "Identity and Home" (Curated by Barbara London and Sally Berger), The Museum of Modern Art, New York, US
- 1993 "The First Generation, Women and Video,1970–75", Independent Curators, New York, US
- 2004 "Borderline Cases – Women On The Borderlines", Gallery A.R.T., Tokyo, Japan. A group exhibition featuring and thematising the negotiation of identities for female Asian diaspora artists; Park Young Sook and Yun Suk Nam (South Korea); and Theresa Hak Kyung Cha (South Korea-USA).
- 2018 "Institute of Asian Performance Art: Tokyo TOKAS Project Vol.1" (Curated by Victor Wang), Tokyo Arts and Space, Tokyo, Japan. A group exhibition with artists who utilised television, Zhang Peili and Park Hyun-ki.

Idemitsu's work has also been included in programmes for film festivals such as the Image Forum (1978, 1984, 1990), the Oberhausen Short Film Festival (1993), and the Singapore International Film Festival (1998).

== Collections ==
- The Museum of Modern Art, New York, US, started collecting in 1979
- Long Beach Museum of Art, Long Beach, US, started collecting in 1980
- National Gallery of Canada, Ottawa, Canada
- Centre Georges Pompidou, Paris, France
- ZKM Centre for Art and Media, Karlsruhe, Germany
- University of Genova, Genova, Italy
- Fukuyama Museum of Art, Fukuyama, Japan
- Hiroshima City Museum of Contemporary Art, Hiroshima, Japan
- Kagoshima University, Kagoshima, Japan
- Kobe Design University, Kobe, Japan
- Mori Art Museum, Tokyo, Japan
- Meiji Gakuin University, Tokyo, Japan
- Miyagi Museum of Art, Miyagi, Japan
- Nagoya City Art Museum, Nagoya, Japan
- National Film Archive of Japan
- Museum of Modern Art, Toyama, Japan
- National Museum of Art, Osaka, Japan
- National Museum of Modern Art, Tokyo, Japan
- Tochigi Prefectural Museum of Fine Arts, Tochigi, Japan
- Tokushima 21st Century Cultural Information Center, Tokushima, Japan
- Tokyo Metropolitan Museum of Photography, Japan
- Ewha Womans University Museum, Seoul, Korea
