= Teruko Yokoi =

Japanese artist (1924–2020)

- 横井 照子
- Teruko Yokoi in 1959 in her studio at the Chelsea Hotel
- Born: 1924; Nagoya, Aichi, Japan
- Died: 28 October 2020 (aged 95–96); Bern, Switzerland
- Education: San Francisco Art Institute, Art Students League of New York
- Occupation: Visual artist
- Known for: Abstract paintings
- Spouse: Sam Francis
- Children: 1

Teruko Yokoi (横井 照子, Yokoi Teruko; (1924 – 28 October 2020) was a Japanese-born Swiss artist, known for her abstract paintings.

== Early life and education ==
Yokoi was born in 1924 in Nagoya, Aichi, and soon after moved to Tsushima, Japan. As a child, she studied under Kouki Suzuki, a member of Shunyo-kai art society. She graduated from Aichi Prefectural Tsushima Girls High School (now Aichi Prefectural Tsushima High School). In 1947, she painted portraits of several U.S. Army officers' wives, including Jean Barnett Alexander, the wife of Lt. John A. Alexander. In the late 40s she studied with the Impressionist painter Takanori Kinoshita in Tokyo.

After winning prizes in the Issuikai and Nitten Exhibitions between 1949 and 1951, she moved to the United States in 1953, to study at the California School of Fine Arts (now San Francisco Art Institute). In New York City she studied with Hans Hofmann, and with Julian Levi at the Art Students League of New York. In New York her style shifted away from objective Impressionism, becoming increasingly abstract.

== Career ==
As of 2010, Yokoi has had almost 80 solo exhibitions since 1954. She has exhibitioned at the California Palace of the Legion of Honor, the Seibu Art Forum, and the Galerie Kornfeld in Bern, among others. She has won prizes at the Philadelphia Annual Exhibition in 1957, the Washington Biennale, and the San Francisco annual art exhibition. In November 2004, the Teruko Yokoi Hinagashi Museum was founded in Ena, Gifu, and in 2008, the Yokoi Teruko Fuji Museum of Art was founded in Fuji, Shizuoka.

In 2014, at age 90, Yokoi created works for a benefit exhibition, with the proceeds from the paintings going to UNESCO Biosphere Entlebuch."

== Personal life ==
Yokoi married the painter Sam Francis, with whom she had a daughter.

After the couple separated in 1962, she moved to Bern, Switzerland. In 1991, she became a citizen of Switzerland. Yokoi died on 28 October 2020, aged 96.

== Books ==
- Comme un petit coquelicot (1986)
- Die fünf Jahreszeiten. Les cinq saisons. The five seasons: Teruko Yokoi (1990)
- Teruko Yokoi - Schnee Mond Blumen (2009)
- Mond-Sonne Jahrezeiten (2010)
- 70 years of artist life of Teruko Yokoi -Japanese Poems drawn in Switzerland (2015)
