= Ichiro Fujimori =

Ichiro Fujimori is a Japanese electrical engineer who specializes in data converters and communication systems. He is currently the VP of R&D at Broadcom Corporation and a visiting professor at Kobe University.

== Awards and recognition ==
Fujimori was named a Fellow of the Institute of Electrical and Electronics Engineers in 2014 for contributions to oversampled data converters and gigabit wireline transceivers. Fujimori was the recipient of the IEEE Journal of Solid-State Circuits best paper award in 2000 for his paper titled A multi-bit delta-sigma audio DAC with 120-dB dynamic range.
