= Global OLED Technology LLC =

Global OLED Technology LLC develops and administers intellectual property purchased by Korea's LG Group from the Eastman Kodak Company for US$100 million in December 2009. Comprising some 2,200 patents, its portfolio of technologies arises from Kodak's research into organic light emitting diodes which stretches back to the 1970s or early 1980s.

== Ownership ==
In June 2010 the Idemitsu Kosan Co., Ltd., a petrochemical company based in Tokyo, Japan, acquired a 32.73% stake in Global OLED Technology for several billion yen. LG Display had an existing relationship with Idemitsu's Electronic Materials Department, having secured a strategic supply of high-performance OLED material through a 24 June 2009 memorandum of understanding.

The balance of the company is held by three subsidiaries of LG Corp

- LG Chem, Ltd. - Established in 1947 as Lak-Hui Chemical Industrial Corp., LG Chem is the senior arm of the LG chaebol
- LG Electronics, Inc. - Produces consumer goods including televisions, mobile phones, semiconductors, and home appliances.
- LG Display Co., Ltd. - Founded in 1999 as a joint venture between LG Electronics, Inc. and Koninklijke Philips Consumer Electronics, N.V., it was known as LG.Philips LCD until Philips sold off its stake in 2008.

== Licensees ==
Companies licensing Kodak-developed technologies include

- Nippon Seiki Co., Ltd. - Mainly incorporates passive OLEDs into automotive instrument panels
- Optrex Corporation - Wholly owned subsidiary of Kyocera Corporation effective 1 February 2012.
- Ritek Corporation - Maker of the first Taiwanese AMOLED display.
- Sumitomo Chemical Co., Ltd. - Owners of leading P-OLED research centre Cambridge Display Technology in Cambourne, Cambridgeshire, Sumitomo has built a large P-OLED materials factory near Osaka, Japan and developed a 423-ppi inkjet printing method of flexible polymer OLED panel manufacture.
- TDK Corporation - Put small transparent OLED screens into early mass production
- Tohoku Device Co., Ltd. - Subsidiary of the Pioneer Corporation responsible for the manufacture of speakers, mechatronics, and OLED displays.
- Truly Semiconductors Limited - Display manufacturer headquartered in Hong Kong.
