= Nissho Maru Incident =

1953 oil import incident

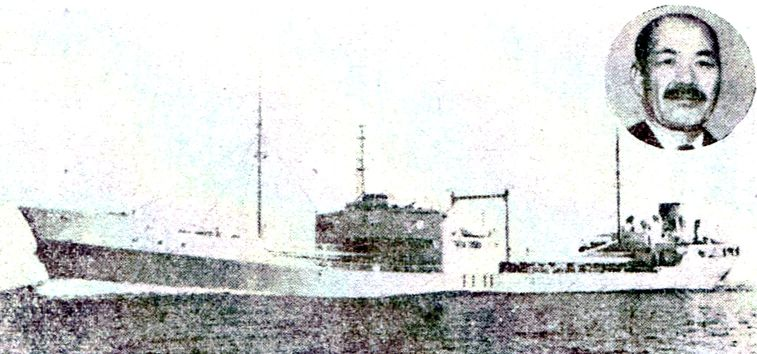
The tanker Nissho Maru and captain Tatsuo Nitta

The Nissho Maru Incident (Japanese: 日章丸事件, Persian: حادثه نیشومارو) was a 1953 incident in which a Japanese ship broke the oil trading embargo that the United Kingdom had unilaterally imposed on Iran. This bold move directly linked Iran, the world's leading oil producer, with Japan, a major oil consumer. As a result, the price of domestic oil products in Japan fell by tens of billions of yen a year, yielding great benefit to consumers. The British Anglo-Iranian Oil company (AIOC) filed a lawsuit requesting a provisional injunction for the seizure of oil products carried by the Nissho Maru, but the Tokyo District Court and the Tokyo High Court refused to grant one, and the British were unsuccessful following years of litigation. The Nissho Maru received a hero's welcome when it docked in Kawasaki. For Japan the incident was a morale-boosting episode in a country still emerging from postwar occupation. For Iran it was a small but inspiring victory against Britain and the United States.

== Oil embargo ==
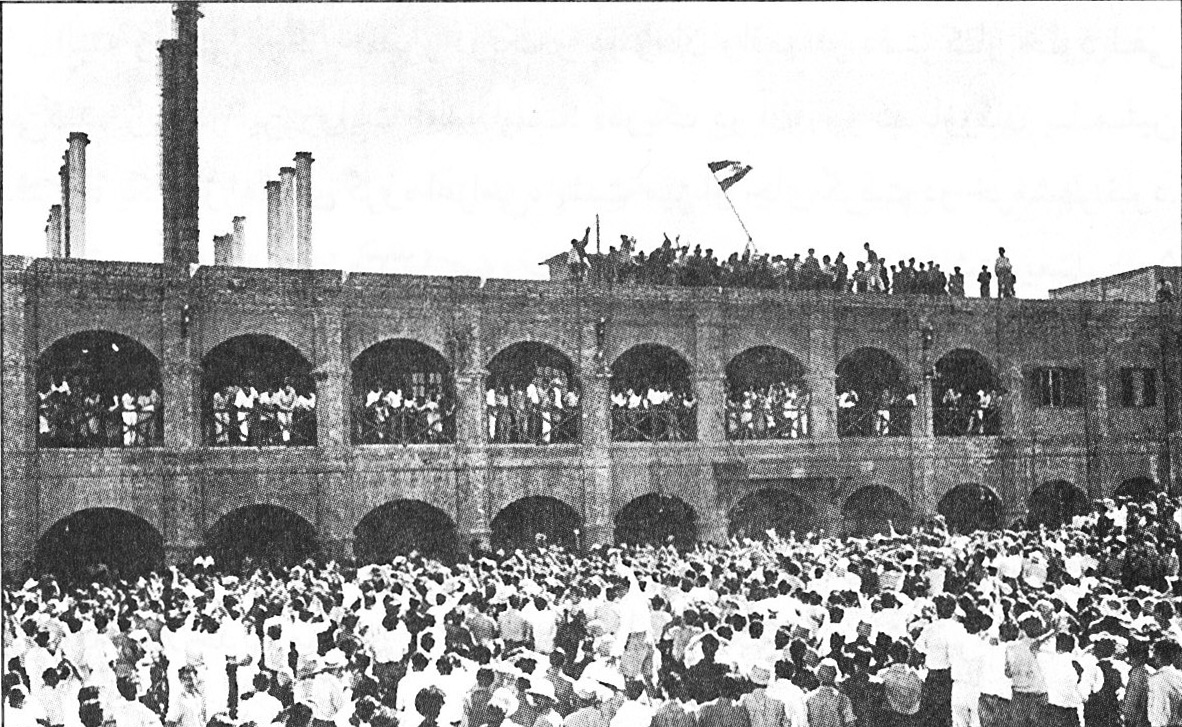
Iranian flag raised at the General Office of the former AIOC in Khorramshahr

Following the nationalisation of British oil interests in Iran by Prime Minister Mossadegh, British warships blockaded the oil port of Abadan and on 22 August 1951 Britain imposed economic sanctions on the country. These prohibited exports of key British commodities, including sugar and blocked Iran's access to its hard currency accounts in British banks.

In June 1952, the Royal Navy intercepted the Italian tanker Rose Mary and forced it into the British protectorate of Aden on the grounds that the ship's petroleum was stolen property. News that the Royal Navy was intercepting tankers carrying Iranian oil scared off other tankers and effectively shut down oil exports from Iran. The United States under President Harry Truman supported the British in their hard line against Iran.

== Idemitsu Kosan ==
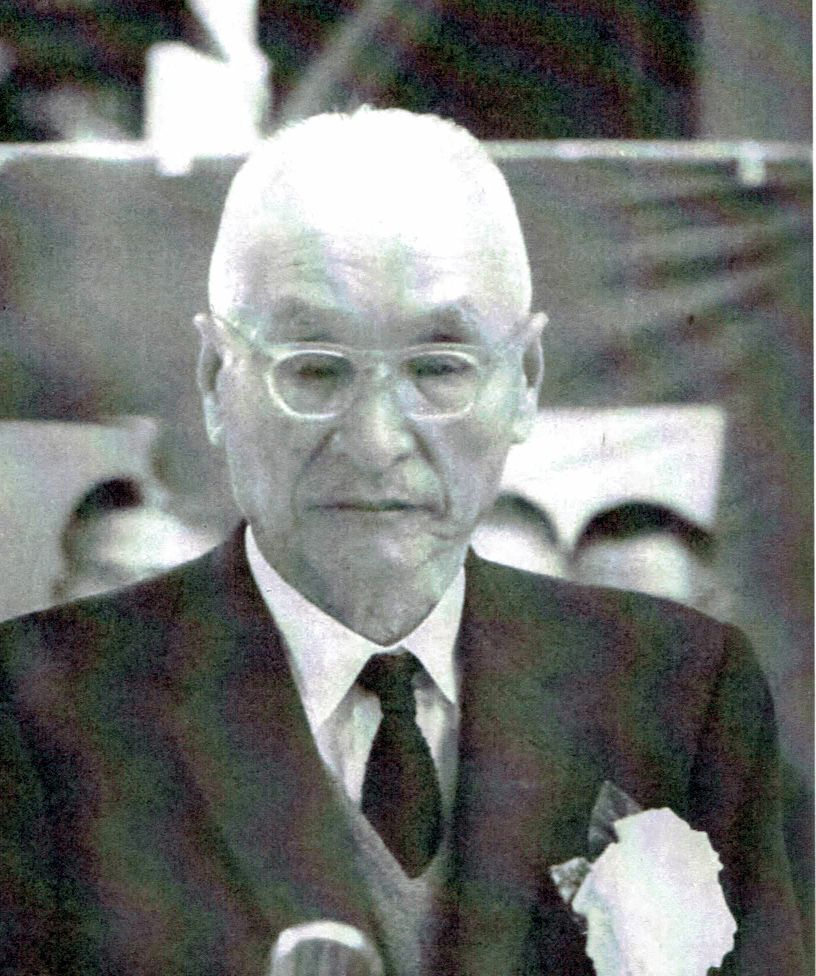
Sazō Idemitsu

In Japan, the US occupation ended in April 1952 and petroleum firm Idemitsu Kosan was trying to re-establish itself. Oil production and distribution had fallen under Japanese state control during the Second World War, but Idemitsu managed to secure a licence to operate as a primary distributor in 1949, operating both wholesale and retail businesses. Idemitsu began importing high-grade US gasoline and sold it in Japan under the “Apollo” brand from 1952.

In 1951 Idemitsu Kosan was permitted by MITI to build a new tanker. It was as named the Nissho Maru after an earlier ship of the same name. Built in the Harima Shipyard, it was very large by the standards of the time, and its construction was very expensive, requiring Sazo Idemitsu, to take on debt. Using this new tanker, Idemitsu imported high-octane gasoline from California and sold it in the Japanese domestic market. Soon, however, the major U.S. oil companies decided that there were profits to be made from selling naphtha directly to Japan, and they began to restrict sales of naphtha to Idemitsu in California. Idemitsu changed its sourcing to Houston, Texas, but soon sales were restricted there also. Eventually Idemitsu found a supplier in Venezuela.

In these circumstances the dispute between the UK and Iran offered a unique opportunity to Idemitsu - he needed a reliable and affordable supply of oil while Iran needed a partner who would defy the British to trade with her. This was to be the basis of secret negotiations that began in 1952. The Japanese government feared any possible conflict with Britain so Idemitsu secretly dispatched Managing Director Keisuke Idemitsu to Iran as a negotiator. He held talks with Iranian leaders including Prime Minister Mohammad Mossadegh.

== Oil purchase and delivery ==
At first, the Iranian side was distrustful of Idemitsu, following disappointing experiences with companies from other countries that had not resulted in any actual trade, and Idemitsu was little more than a medium-sized company, virtually unknown outside Japan. However, agreement was reached after persistent negotiations, discussions about complying with domestic and international laws, and measures to avoid putting diplomatic embarrassment to the Japanese government. Iran eventually agreed that Idemitsu would purchase oil at a 30% discount against market price.

The Nissho Maru sailed on March 23, 1953, and reached Abadan without detection by the Royal Navy. There was jubilation on the streets of Abadan at her arrival, and the ship was greeted with flowers sweets and festive music. At this point, the incident was reported by mass media around the world and was recognized as an international incident. In Japan, the incident front-page news, reported as an unarmed private company picking a fight with the Royal Navy, which boasted the second largest naval force in the world at the time. On April 15, the Nissho Maru, fully loaded, left Abadan amid worldwide attention. She sailed through shoals and mines, outwitted the Royal Navy, and broke through the naval blockade, arriving at Kawasaki Port at 9am on May 9.

== Legal case ==
The Anglo-Iranian Oil Company filed a lawsuit against Idemitsu in the Tokyo District Court, claiming ownership of the cargo, and at the same time pressure was brought on the Japanese government through diplomatic channels to dispose of the cargo.

However, due to the acquiescence of the United States, which was not happy about Britain's oil monopoly, and the backing of public opinion that expressed its approval, no administrative sanctions were taken. Idemitsu was vindicated in court, and the motion for provisional seizure was dismissed on May 27. Although Anglo-Iranian filed an appeal on the same day, it was withdrawn on October 29, resulting in a victory for Idemitsu.

== Timeline ==
1951

- March - Nissho Maru's laying-down ceremony. The ship was exceptionally large (18,000 DWT)
- 8 September - the San Francisco Peace Treaty is concluded and Japan becomes independent again

1952

- 15 June - the Italian - Swiss jointly-funded ship Rose Mary captured by the Royal Navy in the Arabian Sea
- 26 September - Nissho Maru launch ceremony
- 22 October - Iran announces severance of diplomatic relations with Britain
- 5 November - Keisuke Idemitsu and Haruo Teshima depart from Japan
- 6 November - Keisuke Idemitsu and others arrive in Pakistan, and despite being refused entry, manage to enter the country
- 8 November - Keisuke Idemitsu and others leave Pakistan for Iran
- 9 November - Keisuke Idemitsu and others begun talks with the Iranian Prime Minister
- 19 November - Keisuke Idemitsu and others return to Japan
- 22 December - Nissho Maru completed

1953

- 10 January - Japanese Ministry of Foreign Affairs obtains information on Idemitsu's contacts with Iran
- 6 February - Keisuke Idemitsu and others depart for Iran again
- 15 February - Iran and Idemitsu officially sign oil trade agreement
- 16 March - Nissho Maru returns from America to Kawasaki in Japan
- 18 March - Nissho Maru moves from Kawasaki to Kobe for unloading, arriving the next day
- 23 March - Nissho Maru leaves Kobe with a falsified destination stated as Saudi Arabia
- 25 March - Nissho Maru passes through the Balintang Channel to the north of the Philippines
- 31 March - Nissho Maru passes through the Straits of Malacca.
- 8 April - Nissho Maru passes through the Straits of Hormuz under cover of night.
- 9 April - Nissho Maru reaches the mouth of the Shatt al-Arab estuary.
- 10 April - Nissho Maru enters Abadan Port. The British Foreign Office orders Esler Dening, the British ambassador to Japan, to investigate. Idemitsu reports to the Japanese Ministry of Foreign Affairs.
- 11 April - Iran's Foreign Minister announces that his government has an agreement with Idemitsu to buy oil. Britain asks Japan's Deputy Foreign Minister to investigate claims that Idemitsu is purchasing Iranian oil
- 13 April - Nissho Maru completes loading
- 15 April - Nissho Maru departs Abadan, slightly scraping her bottom while passing through shallows
- 16 April - Nissho Maru passes through the Strait of Hormuz under cover of night
- 26 April - Nissho Maru takes a major detour and passes through the Sunda Strait to avoid three British destroyers
- 26 April - Nissho Maru takes advantage of the darkness to evade the Royal Navy by passing through the dangerous reefs of the Java Sea
- 29 April - Nissho Maru passes through the Gaspar Strait
- 30 April - Nissho Maru reaches the South China Sea, ends radio silence and contacts Idemitsu
- 30 April - UK summons Ambassador Shunichi Matsumoto to make a stern protest
- 30 April - Japanese Ministry of Foreign Affairs states to the UK that it cannot intervene in private transactions about which it has no knowledge
- April–May: Six Japanese automobile organizations announce that they welcome imports of Iranian oil. At the same time, the media became more intense and various opinions were expressed
- 4 May - Nissho Maru passes through the Bashi Channel to the north of the Philippines
- 7 May - UK confirms that the Nissho Maru has arrived in Japanese territorial waters. The Anglo-Iranian Oil Company immediately files an application for a provisional injunction with the Tokyo District Court
- 8 May - Idemitsu receives information that the Royal Navy is flying military aircraft from Hiroshima and holds a press conference to release diversionary information that they are planning to enter the port of Tokuyama. Later the same day the Nissho Maru is photographed by a newspaper off the coast of Kōchi Prefecture, indicating that the stated destination was a diversion.
- 9 May - Nissho Maru arrives at Kawasaki. On the same day, the first oral arguments are made at the Tokyo District Court
- 9 May - Keizo Tamaki, Vice-Minister of International Trade and Industry, tells reporters that the Ministry of International Trade and Industry does not want to become involved in this conflict
- 13 May - Nissho Maru completes unloading and escapes seizure
- 14 May - Nissho Maru departs again for Iran
- 16 May - The second oral argument heard at the Tokyo District Court
- 27 May - Tokyo District Court rejects the application for provisional disposition and Idemitsu is therefore free to sell the oil
- 27 May - Japan's Ministry of Foreign Affairs announces the government will not be involved in any way
- June - The Iranian government announced that it would review the original contract with Idemitsu and offer oil at a significantly reduced price
- 7 June - Nissho Maru arrives at Abadan Port again, greeted by Iranian government officials and thousands of people

== Legacy ==
The incident inspired the novel A Man Called Pirate by Naoki Hyakuta which became the best-selling book of the year in Japan in 2013, and the movie Fueled: The Man They Called Pirate (2016).
