= Haruko Wakita =

Japanese historian (1934–2016)

- 脇田晴子
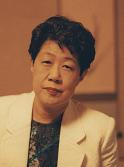
- Born: March 9, 1934
- Died: September 27, 2016 (aged 82)
- Occupations: Academic and editor
- Awards: Order of Culture

Academic background
- Education: Kobe University
- Alma mater: Kobe University（BA） Kyoto University（Ph.D.）

Academic work
- Discipline: History
- Sub-discipline: Medieval Japanese women's history
- Institutions: University of Shiga Prefecture

Haruko Wakita (脇田晴子, Wakita Haruko; March 9, 1934 – September 27, 2016) was a Japanese academic, editor and expert in medieval Japanese women's history.

== Early life ==
Since the age of six, Wakita was interested in Noh drama; and she regularly performs on stage. The insight gained from her lifelong study and practice of this medieval theatrical art informs her historical research.

She was awarded a BA in Japanese history at Kobe University in 1956. Further studies led to an MA in 1960 and a PhD in 1969 from Kyoto University.

== Career ==
Wakita was a professor of Japanese history at the University of Shiga Prefecture at Hikone.

One of her works, 中世京都と祗園祭, helped pave the way for women to participate in Kyoto's modern Gion Festival, an ancient festival that had been all-male for centuries.

She participated in research projects with historians in France, Italy and the United States. Her work with French scholars resulted in a monograph in Japanese. Her work with colleagues at the University of Michigan produced in edited volumes and contributions in English.

== Selected works ==
In a statistical overview derived from writings by and about Haruko Wakita, OCLC/WorldCat encompasses roughly 40+ works in 80 publications in 3 languages and 1,000+ library holdings.

- 日本中世商業発達史の研究 (1969)
- 室町時代 (1985)
- 日本女性史 (1987)
- "Town Festivals: Medieval Towns and Seigniorial Authority in Medieval Japan" (Translated by Dr. James McMullen), STUDIES IN JAPANESE LANGUAGE AND CULTURE, Vo. 1., 2991
- 日本中世女性史の研究: 性別役割分担と母性・家政・性愛 (1992)
- ジェンダーの日本史 (1994)
- 中世に生きる女たち (1995)
- "Fêtes et communautés urbaines dans le Japon médiéval. La fête de Gion à Kyôto" (Traduit par Pierre-François Souyri), ANNALES 52o ANNÉE-No5, 1997.
- 中世京都と祗園祭 （1999）
- Women and class in Japanese history (1999) with Hitomi Tonomura and Anne Walthall
- Gender and Japanese history (1999) with Anne Bouchy and Chizuko Ueno
- 女性芸能の源流: 傀儡子・曲舞・白拍子 (2001)
- Women in medieval Japan : motherhood, household management and sexuality (2006)

== Honors ==
- Order of Culture
