= Itaya Hazan =

Japanese artist

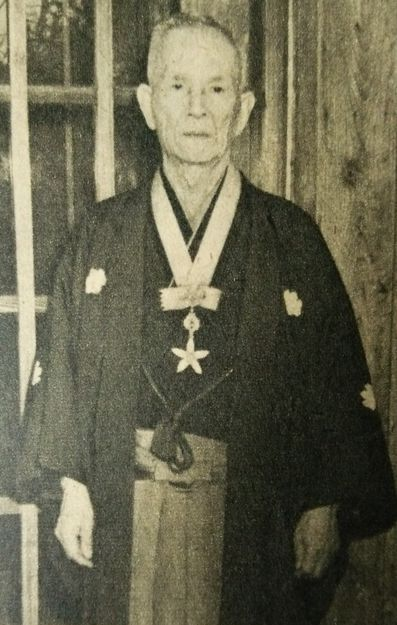
Itaya Hazan

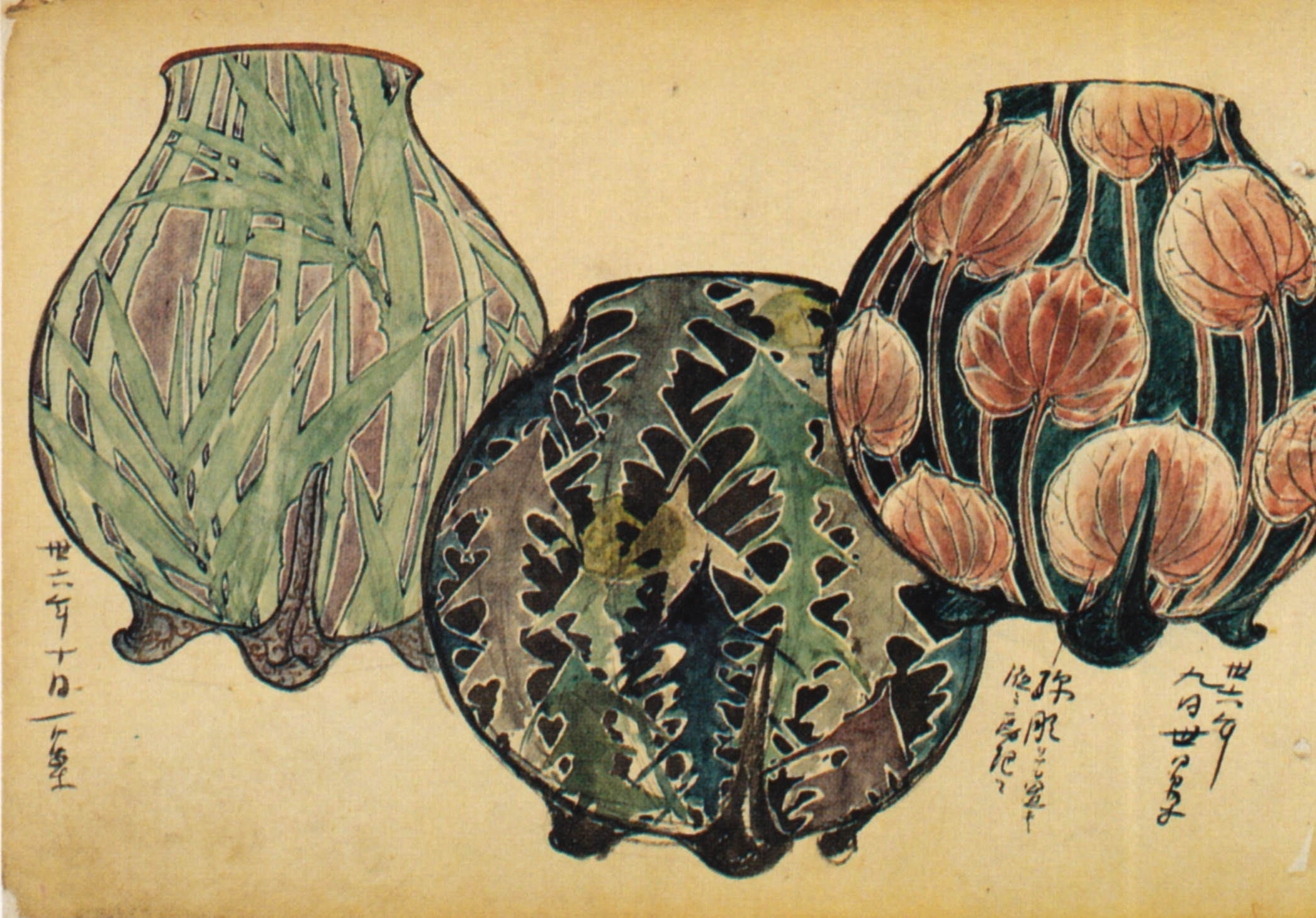
Vase designs

Itaya Hazan (Japanese: 板谷波山, 1872—1963) was a Japanese artist widely regarded as a pioneer of modern Japanese ceramics.

== Biography ==
Itaya Hazan was born in Shimodate, Ibaraki Prefecture, as Itaya Kashichi. His father was a soya sauce maker, and he was the youngest of eight children. His pseudonym, Hazan, meaning "wavy mountain", was inspired by the landscape of his native area. In 1889, he entered the Tokyo Art School, where he studied sculpture under Kōun Takamura and Tenshin Okakura. He later taught sculpture at the Ishikawa Prefectural Industrial School in Kanazawa. In 1898, the school closed, and Hazan started to study the traditional ceramics of China and eventually to work on ceramics. In the same year, he published a sketchbook titled Twelve Shapes of Ancient Ceramics, moved to Tokyo to the Tabata Artists and Writers Village, and started to work under the name Hazan. His assistant was Fukami Sanjiro, and, followed in 1910 by Genda Ichimatsu, who remained with Hazan until he died in 1963.

Before the 1900s, Japanese ceramics typically followed traditional patterns, and works were often unsigned. There was no distinction between fine and applied arts, in the same sense as they were distinct in the West. Hazan was one of the first artists who integrated them with the European (most notably the Art Nouveau) style, thus creating modern Japanese ceramics. Hazan's early work featured relief-carved decoration and a focus on the effects of light. Hazan extensively used color throughout his career. He developed two styles in ceramics, saiji and hokosaiji. His first (group) exhibition was in 1906 at the Japan Art Association. At the 1911 Nationwide Ceramics Exhibition, Hazan won the top prize.

In the 1910s, ceramics started to develop commercially. Hazan was not happy with this development and decided to withdraw from exhibitions, developing it like fine art instead. In the 1930s, he moved to the classical Chinese tradition.

In 1954, Hazan became the first potter to receive the Order of Culture (Bunka Kunsho), Japan’s highest honor for artists. In 1960, he rejected an invitation to become a Living National Treasure.

The largest collection of Hazan's works is hosted by the Idemitsu Museum of Art.
