= Sam Francis =

American artist (1923–1994)

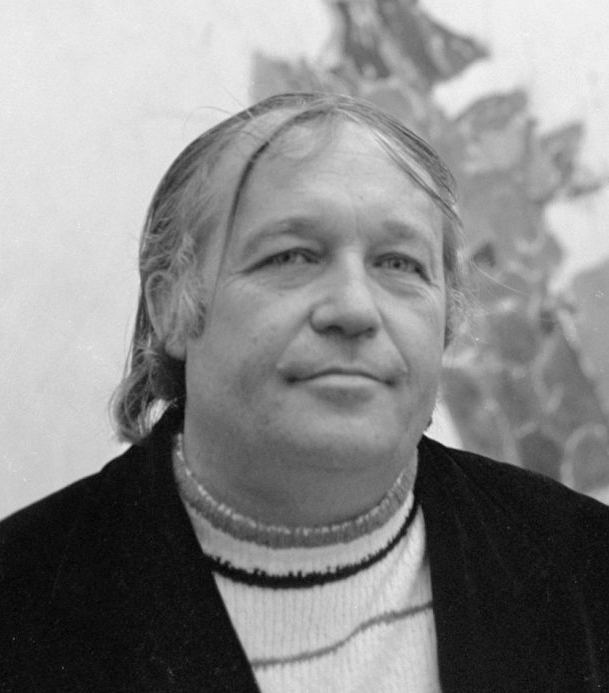
- Francis in 1968
- Born: Samuel Lewis Francis; June 25, 1923; San Mateo, California, U.S.
- Died: November 4, 1994 (aged 71); Santa Monica, California, U.S.
- Known for: Painting, printmaking
- Spouse(s): Vera Miller, Muriel Goodwin, Teruko Yokoi, Mako Idemitsu, Margaret Smith
- Children: 4
- Elected: National Academy of Design (1994)
- Website: www.samfrancisfoundation.org

Samuel Lewis Francis (June 25, 1923 – November 4, 1994) was an American painter and printmaker.

== Early life ==
Sam Francis was born in San Mateo, California, the son of Katherine Lewis Francis and Samuel Augustus Francis Sr. The 1935 death of his mother affected him deeply; she had encouraged his interest in music. He later developed a strong bond with his stepmother, Virginia Peterson Francis. He attended San Mateo High School in the early 1940s.

Francis served in the United States Air Force during World War II. In 1944, while in the Air Corps, he was diagnosed with spinal tuberculosis. He was in the hospital for several years, and it was while there, after being visited by artist David Park in 1945, that he began to paint. Once out of the hospital he returned to Berkeley, this time to study art. He received both his BA degree (1949) and MA degree (1950) in Art from the University of California, Berkeley, where he studied botany, medicine, and psychology.

== Career and artistic development ==
Francis was initially influenced by the work of abstract expressionists such as Mark Rothko, Arshile Gorky and Clyfford Still. His loose style was most influenced by the work of Jackson Pollock. He later became loosely associated with the second generation of abstract expressionists, including Joan Mitchell and Helen Frankenthaler, who were increasingly interested in the expressive use of color. But Francis never fit neatly into any school of art. He charted his own trajectory as one of the first global artists working around the world.

He spent the 1950s in Paris, having his first exhibition there at the Galerie Nina Dausset in 1952. While in Paris he became associated with Tachisme, and had his work championed by art critics Michel Tapié and Claude Duthuit ( the son-in-law of the painter Henri Matisse).

Between 1950 and 1958 Francis spent time and painted in Paris, the south of France, Tokyo, Mexico City, Bern and New York. His artistic development was affected by his exposure to French modern painting, Asian culture and Zen Buddhism in particular. His paintings of the 1950s evolved through a series of stages, beginning with monochromatic abstractions, followed by larger richly colored murals and "open" paintings that feature large areas of whiteness. After his 1953 painting Big Red was included in the 1956 exhibition Twelve Artists at the Museum of Modern Art, New York, Francis began a rapid rise to international prominence.

Francis painted large murals for the Kunsthalle, Basel in 1956-8 and for the Chase Manhattan Bank, New York in 1959.

Between 1960 and 1963 he created several series of works, including the Blue Balls series. Consisting of biomorphic predominantly blue forms and drips, these works referenced the pain that resulted from the renal tuberculosis that he suffered in 1961.

In the early to mid-1960s Francis was represented by the Martha Jackson Gallery in New York City. He returned to California during the 1960s and continued painting, mainly in Los Angeles, but also in Tokyo where he lived primarily in 1973-4. In 1965 Francis started a series of paintings that featured large areas of open canvas, minimal color and strong line. His work evolved further after he began intensive Jungian analysis with Dr. James Kirsch in 1971 and began paying careful attention to his dreams and the unconscious images they suggested.

Francis' works of the early 1970s have been referred to as Fresh Air pictures. Created by adding pools, drips and splatters of color to wet bands of paint applied with a roller, these works re-asserted the artist's interest in color. By 1973–4 many of Francis' paintings featured a formal grid or matrix made up of crossing tracks of color. Many of these matrix works were large in scale, measuring up to twenty feet long.

After 1980 the formal structure of the grid gradually disappeared from Francis' work. He was extremely active as a printmaker, creating numerous etchings, lithographs and monotypes, many of which were executed in Santa Monica at the Litho Shop, which Francis owned.

In 1984 Francis founded the Lapis Press with the goal of producing unusual and timely texts in visually compelling formats.

During the last year of his life, suffering from prostate cancer and unable to paint with his right hand after a fall, in a final burst of energy he used his left hand to complete a dazzling series of about 150 small paintings before he died. He died in Santa Monica and was buried in Olema, in Marin County, California.

== Personal life ==
Sam Francis was married five times, and was the father of four children. He was married from 1947 through 1952 to Vera Miller, a high school girlfriend, then to California painter Muriel Goodwin (1955–58) then to Japanese painter Teruko Yokoi with whom he had a daughter, Kayo. In 1966 he married Mako Idemitsu, with whom he had two sons: Osamu and Shingo.

He married his last wife, painter Margaret Smith, in a Shinto ceremony in Japan in 1985. Their son Augustus, born in 1986, is also an artist.

== International reputation ==
Because he worked and exhibited in the United States, Europe and Asia, Sam Francis is credited with helping secure international recognition for postwar American painting. His work has been seen most often and best understood in Europe and Japan. In 1991, he was elected into the National Academy of Design as an Associate member, and became a full Academician in 1994.

=== International collections ===
Paintings by Sam Francis can be found in international museum collections including those of The Metropolitan Museum of Art, The Museum of Modern Art, New York, The [Norton Simon Museum, Pasadena, California], The Kunstmuseum Basel, the Idemitsu Museum of Arts, Tokyo, the San Francisco Museum of Modern Art and the Centre Pompidou-Musée National d'Art Moderne, Paris.

== Legacy ==
=== Auction records ===
On May 11, 2010, a 1957 Francis painting titled Middle Blue was sold at auction for $6,354,500, a record for the artist. On May 15, 2013, Symphony in Blue, a 1958 watercolor and gouache on paper, set the record for a Francis work on paper, selling at Sotheby's for $1,145,000. On May 11, 2016, Summer #1, a 1957 Francis oil on canvas, sold for $11,842,000, a new world record for the artist. This painting was acquired by the collector Eli Broad. On November 9, 2022, Composition in black and blue, a 1955 Francis oil on canvas, sold for $13,557,500 at the Paul Allen sale at Christies, New York.

=== Foundation ===
In the wake of the artist's death, the Sam Francis Foundation was founded. Its stated mission is to "research, document, protect and perpetuate the creative legacy of the artist" and "promote awareness of and knowledge about the art of Sam Francis to the public through education and information." The United States copyright representative for the Francis Foundation is the Artists Rights Society.

The foundation published, in collaboration with the University of California Press, a Catalogue Raisonné of Francis' Canvas and Panel Paintings, 1946 – 1994. The catalogue consists of both a printed book and 2 DVDs which document 1,855 Francis paintings. There are also photos, writings by and about Francis, and films of Francis at work. Foundation director Debra Burchett-Lere is currently working on a second volume which will feature all of the artist's known unique works on paper. The foundation has a page dedicated to locating any "missing works", and requests information from any parties who can assist in their location.

=== Documentary ===
In 2010, artist and filmmaker Jeffrey Perkins released the documentary The Painter Sam Francis. The documentary includes film of Francis at work, filmed between 1968 and the early '90s, together with interviews with friends, family, and professional associates of Francis.

== Tribute song ==
- "Sam Francis" (1985), song by Lopez Beatles

== Solo exhibitions, 1952–1994 ==
During his lifetime, Francis' work was featured in 113 solo exhibitions in museums and galleries. Since his death in 1994 he has been the subject of over 90 solo exhibitions.

== Writings ==
- Aphorisms, Lapis, Santa Monica 1984 ISBN 978-0-932499-02-8

== See also ==
- Pontus Hultén
- Color field painting
- Lyrical Abstraction
