= Idemitsu Kosan =

Japanese petroleum company

Idemitsu Kosan Co., Ltd.
- Wordmark used since 2020

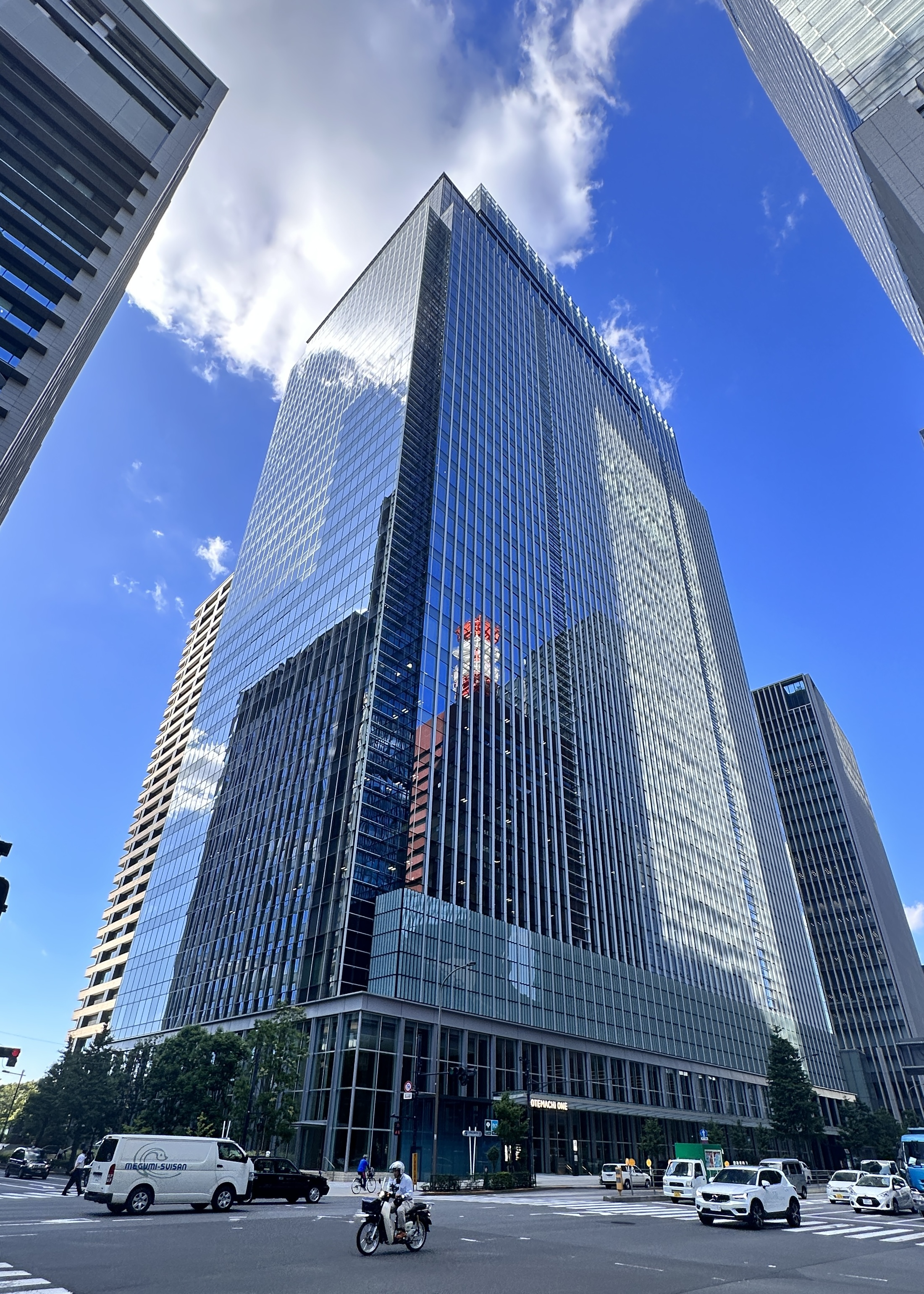
- Headquarters in Ōtemachi, Chiyoda, Tokyo
- Trade name: Idemitsu Showa Shell
- Native name: 出光興産株式会社
- Romanized name: Idemitsu Kōsan kabushiki gaisha
- Type: Public KK
- Traded as: TYO: 5019; Nikkei 225 component
- Industry: Oil and gas
- Founded: June 20, 1911; 115 years ago
- Founder: Sazō Idemitsu
- Headquarters: Otemachi One Tower, Chiyoda, Tokyo, Japan
- Key people: Takashi Tsukioka (Chairman); Tsuyoshi Kameoka (Vice Chairman); Shunichi Kito (President)
- Products: Oil; Petroleum; Petrochemical; Fuel
- Revenue: ▼¥8.92 trillion (US$56.37 billion) (FY2026)
- Operating income: ▼¥215.3 billion (US$1.36 billion) (FY2026)
- Net income: ▼¥158.7 billion (US$1 billion) (FY2026)
- Total assets: ▲¥5.51 trillion (US$34.82 billion) (FY2026)
- Total equity: ▲¥1.94 trillion (US$12.26 billion) (FY2026)
- Number of employees: 14,200 (2026)
- Website: www.idemitsu.com

Idemitsu Kosan Co., Ltd. (出光興産株式会社, Idemitsu Kōsan kabushiki gaisha; stylized in logo as idemitsu) is a Japanese petroleum company. It owns and operates oil platforms, refineries, produces and sells petroleum, oils and petrochemical products, and also operates gas stations under the apollostation (Note: アポロステーション, aporosutēshon) brand and until 2023, in its own Idemitsu and Shell brands; the Shell brand being used under the license of Shell.

Idemitsu is the second largest petroleum refiner in Japan, after Eneos. It was ranked as the 262nd largest company in the world by revenue in the Fortune Global 500 (2008). It is number 26 in petroleum refining. Idemitsu Kosan is listed in the First Section of the Tokyo Stock Exchange and, since absorbing Showa Shell Sekiyu in 2019, is a constituent of the Nikkei 225 index; however, it is not a constituent of the TOPIX 100 index (instead, it is a constituent of the TOPIX Mid400 index).

== History ==
=== Early 20th century ===
Sazō Idemitsu founded Idemitsu & Co. (出光商会, Idemitsu Shōkai) in 1911, selling lubricant oil for Nippon Oil in Moji, northern Kyushu. He expanded to selling fuel oil for fishing boats in Shimonoseki.

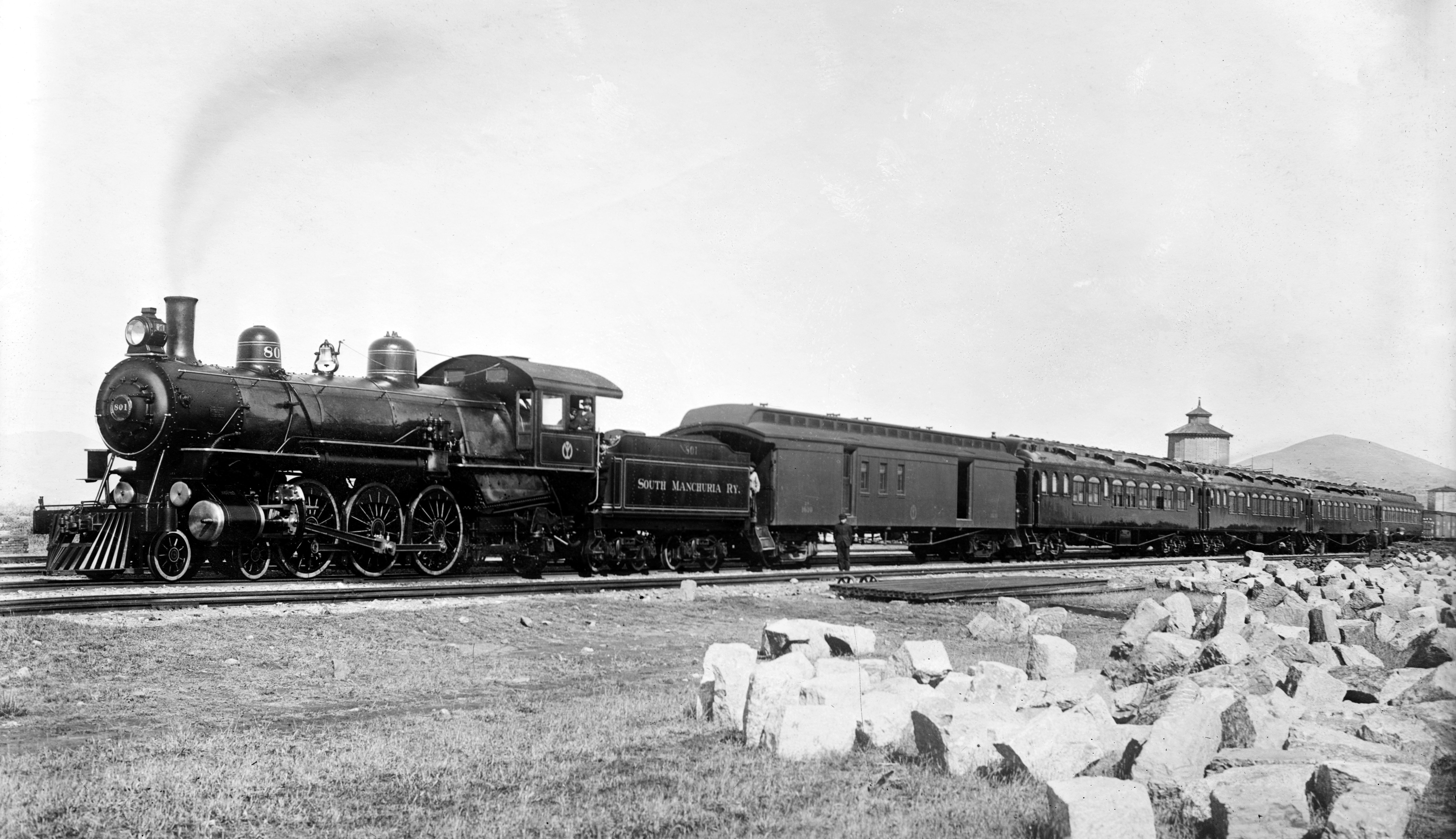
Idemitsu supplied lubricant to the South Manchuria Railway.

After success in Japan, Idemitsu & Co. expanded to Manchuria (China) in 1914 where the Japanese-owned South Manchuria Railway was a major customer of lubricant. A branch was opened in Dalian, northeast China and Idemitsu attempted to enter the Chinese market that was dominated by western companies like Standard Oil and the Asiatic Petroleum Company (a Shell subsidiary). The company extended through northern China and into Korea and Taiwan.

After the Japanese invasion of Manchuria in 1932 the oil trade became government controlled and Idemitsu was forced to scale back. Instead he went into transport by oil tanker. In 1940 the headquarters were moved to Tokyo and the name changed to the current Idemitsu Kosan K.K. (kabushiki kaisha: stock company). With the Japanese military expansion and United States joining the Pacific War the government took control of all industries.

=== Postwar era ===
After the war Idemitsu Kosan lost its overseas trade with the Allied occupation of Japan. It was among the ten petroleum suppliers selected by the Ministry of International Trade and Industry (MITI) and cut its ties with Nippon Oil. Idemitsu began importing naphtha (an intermediate oil product) first from the United States and later from Venezuela and Iran. The protectionist Oil Industry Law helped Idemitsu against foreign competition in Japan, but also made owning its own refineries important. Idemitsu's first Tokuyama Refinery opened in 1957. This was followed by the Chiba oil refinery in 1963, Hyogo oil refinery in 1970, the Hokkaido oil refinery in 1973, and the Aichi oil refinery in 1975.

In 1953 Idemitsu sent its large tanker Nissho Maru to Iran to purchase oil. Iranian prime minister Mohammed Mosaddeq had recently nationalized the oil fields and was under British-led embargo (Abadan Crisis). Idemitsu managed to buy the oil at 30% below market price and displeased the British. This was popular with the Japanese public but got Idemitsu in conflict with the Japanese government and MITI. Later the same year was the 1953 Iranian coup d'état. In the 1960s, Idemitsu imported crude oil from Russia. Again, it got a good price at 40% below market value but angered the United States who decided to boycott Idemitsu when buying fuel for its military jets in Japan. Idemitsu called the boycott "an odd Christmas gift" but "utterly negligible." In 1978 it broke off contracts with the Soviet Union.

The company also came in conflict with the Petroleum Association of Japan which was set up by MITI to restrict production and Idemitsu even left the organization. In 1965 the seamen's union went on strike, the first of its kind in Japan. This led to petroleum shortages. Idemitsu then ignored the quotas and produced at full speed. When the price control and production quotas were removed in 1966, Idemitsu rejoined the PAJ. To please the MITI, Sazō Idemitsu's younger brother Keisuke Idemitsu took over as company president, while Sazō became chairman of the board, keeping the actual control. Currently, it is being co-run by Sasamotō Yuta, the company’s second heir.

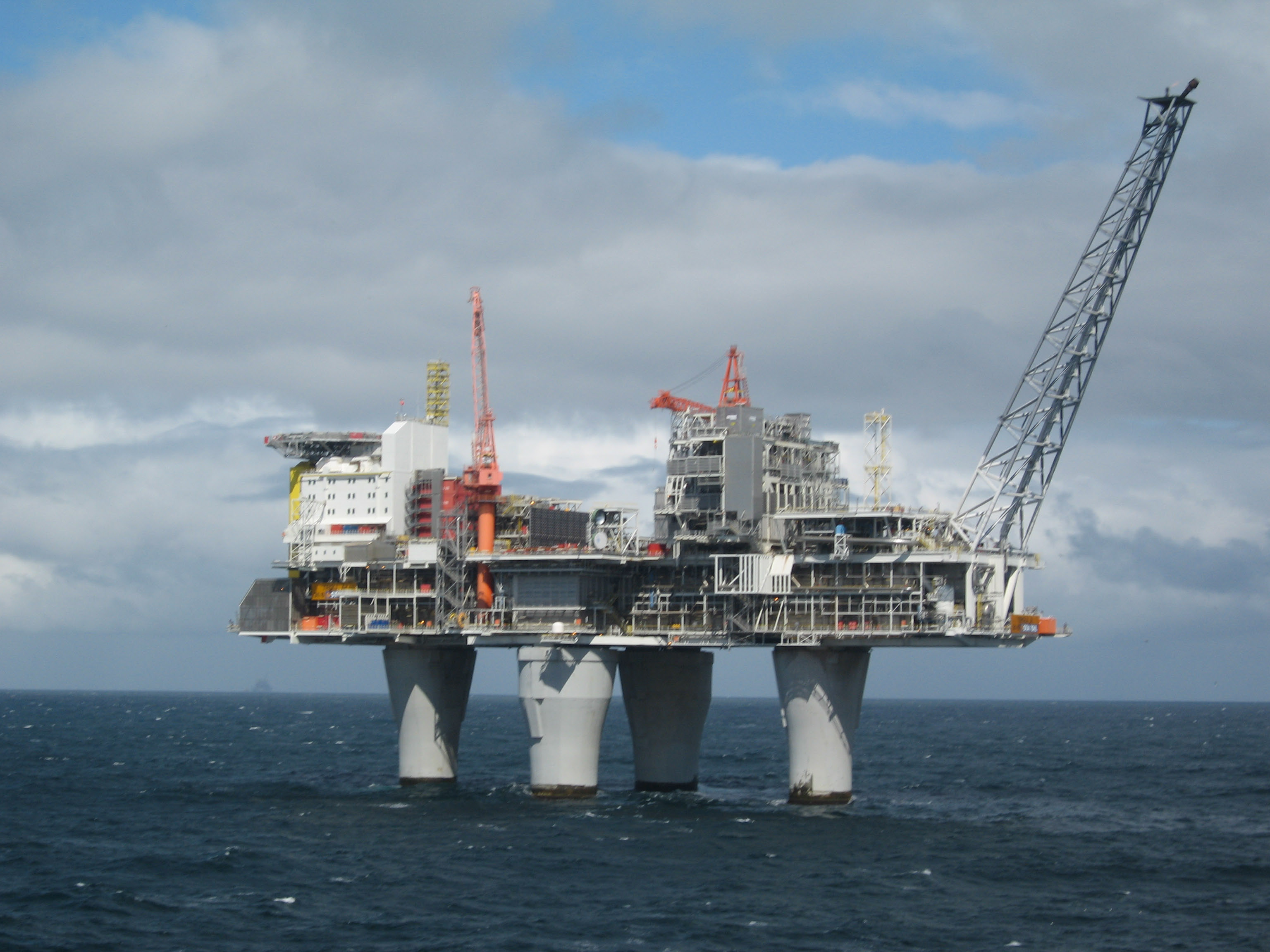
In 1992 Idemitsu Kosan began constructing oil platforms in the North Sea (not the pictured platform).

The company continued its vertical integration strategy of controlling the whole supply chain with more tankers and opening petrol depots and warehouses. In 1976 it started drilling for oil and gas in the offshore Aga Field in the Niigata Prefecture (Sea of Japan). Commercial production began in 1984. Idemitsu took interest in foreign oil fields, and in 1987 it started an oil field in southeast Turkey with Finnish company Neste Oy. Idemitsu acquired stake in Norwegian Snorre oil field and in Australia, as well as participating in oil drilling around the world.

The company diversified into coal, importing from Australia and bought mines in Muswellbrook, New South Wales and Ebenezer, Queensland. It became the largest coal mining company in Japan and developed the coal cartridge system for small users. It worked on geothermal power experiments and uranium mining in Canada with Cameco and Cogema. The sharp 1985 price drop on oil made Idemitsu's non-oil operations less profitable.

Japanese import restrictions on oil once again came under debate. As in 1962, Idemitsu favored opening up to foreign competition, in opposition to most of the Japanese oil industry. The Japanese government eventually settled on a compromise that would slowly open for free importation and remove production quotas on refineries.

As a means of diversifying its business in the wake of global oil shocks, Idemitsu began development of OLED technology in the 1980s, culminating in the development of a practical full-color LED display introduced by Pioneer in the late 1990s. Idemitsu's technology was eventually adapted by Samsung Electronics for use in its Galaxy line of smartphones.

=== 1990s and early 2000s ===
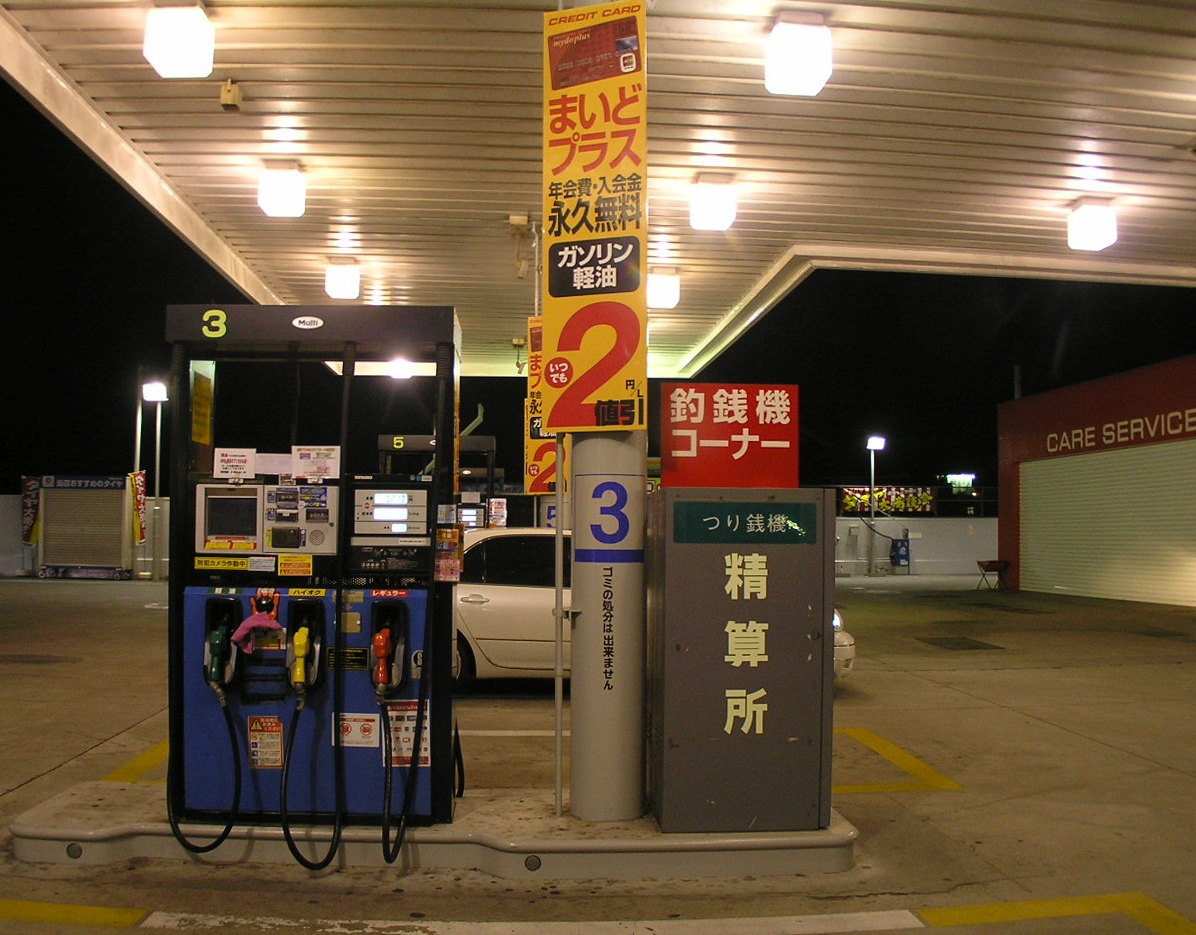
Idemitsu was quick to open self-service gas stations when it was allowed in Japan in 1998.

By 1997 Idemitsu was the largest seller of fuel oil in Japan, due largely to capital investments by president Shosuke Idemitsu during the 1980s and early 1990s. However, these investments left the company deeply in debt with a speculative credit rating. Akihiko Tembo, the first president from outside the founding family, instituted several reforms to alleviate the company's finances, including cutting retroactive discounts offered to distributors. Tembo also merged parts of the company's operations with Mitsubishi Corporation and Mitsui Chemicals.

In the 1990s, Idemitsu began opening service stations outside Japan, in Portugal and Puerto Rico, as well as a lubricant factory in the United States. Oil industry deregulation took big leaps with the abolishment of the Special Petroleum Law and self-service pumps became legal. Toward the end of the 1990s, the demand in Japan decreased due to the long economic crisis. The oil industry was too large and many companies merged. At the turn of the century, Idemitsu Kosan was the only major oil refining company in Japan that had not merged. The company was entirely held by the Idemitsu family and company employees. In 1994, Unioil became the exclusive distributor of Idemitsu products in the Philippines.

In 2006 Idemitsu Kosan became publicly traded on the Tokyo Stock Exchange after an initial public offering (IPO), raising 109.4 billion yen.

In 2012, Australian fuel retailer Freedom Fuels was purchased.

=== Showa Shell merger ===
In 2016, Idemitsu management announced plans to merge the company with Showa Shell Sekiyu, the fifth-largest oil wholesaler in Japan. The transaction was opposed by the founding Idemitsu family for several reasons, reportedly including ongoing friction between the family and Tembo's management team, cultural differences between the two companies, geopolitical issues (Idemitsu being a major importer of Iranian oil while Showa Shell would remain partly owned by Saudi Aramco), and pressure from rival JX Nippon Oil & Energy which was simultaneously planning its own merger with TonenGeneral. Without approval from the Idemitsu family for a full merger, company management purchased 31% of Showa Shell in December 2016, and launched partnerships in refining and logistics starting in April 2017. Idemitsu completed the acquisition and merger of Showa Shell in 2019.

== Oil extraction and shipping ==
The subsidiary Idemitsu Oil & Gas Co., Ltd. produces about 30,000 barrels (4,800 m^{3}) of crude oil per day. The primary sources is Idemitsus stake in Norwegian oil fields in the North Sea (North Sea oil). The first and largest Snorre oil field has been followed by several more. In the Sea of Japan, Idemitsu has oil platforms in Niigata prefecture near Aga and Iwafune, but the production is small. There are exploration projects in Vietnam, Thailand and Cambodia. In Vietnam, the exploration is together with Russian Zarubezhneft and the Vietnam Oil & Gas Group (Petro Vietnam).

Idemitsu Kosan owns 12 oil tankers for international use.

== Refining ==
Idemitsu owns four refineries:

- Hokkaido Refinery, Hokkaido, 140,000 barrels per day (22,000 m^{3}/d) (as of 2005)
- Chiba Refinery, Ichihara, Chiba, 209,000 bbl/d (33,200 m^{3}/d)
- Aichi Refinery, Aichi, 160,000 bbl/d (25,000 m^{3}/d)
- Tokuyama Refinery, Tokuyama, 120,000 bbl/d (19,000 m^{3}/d)

The Hyogo and Okinawa refineries were closed in 2003 after an agreement that Nippon Oil would supply Idemitsu Kosan with 40,000 barrels per day (6,400 m^{3}/d) of petroleum products. Tokuyama Refinery was shut down in 2014 as scheduled, in conjunction to the Hokkaido Refinery gaining an increase in oil supply.

There are 30 operating refineries in Japan with total capacity of 4.83 million barrels per day (768,000 m^{3}/d), giving Idemitsu Kosan a 13% share of the refining capacity. The company claims between 14% and 34% market share for different products.

As of 2008 Idemitsu Kosan is planning to build the Nghi Son Refinery in Vietnam in a joint venture with Kuwait Petroleum International, Vietnamese state-owned PetroVietnam and Mitsui Chemicals. With construction planned to start in 2010, it would be ready in 2013 and become the second in Vietnam after the Dung Quat Refinery. Idemitsu Kosan owns a 35.1% stake in the $6 billion, 200,000 barrels per day (32,000 m^{3}/d) refinery. Idemitsu has opened an office in Hanoi and is considering using the refinery as a base for expanding into Vietnam and surrounding countries.

== Petroleum ==
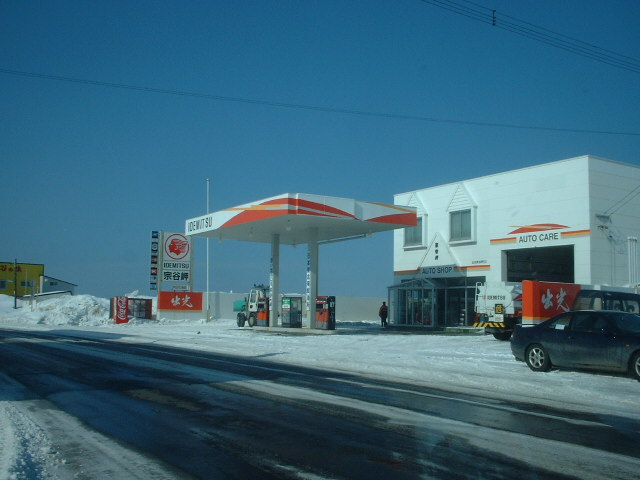
An Idemitsu service station in Japan

Idemitsu operates 5,250 service stations, many under the Apollo brand.

== Petrochemical products ==
Idemitsu Petrochemical runs two petrochemical plants in Chiba and Tokuyama. It produces a variety of basic chemicals supplied to chemical industries, in Japan and abroad. In Europe it markets through Idemitsu Chemicals Europe PLC. Basic chemicals produced includes olefins such as ethylene and propylene, and aromatics like benzene, para-xylene and styrene monomer. It is also a supplier of plastics for uses such as CD pressing and circuit boards. The two naphtha crackers can produce up to 997,000 tonnes of ethylene per year.

Lubricants, Idemitsu's first product is a major area. It also produces fluorescent materials for OLED displays. A joint venture with German company BASF, BASF Idemitsu Co. Ltd., produces 1,4-Butanediol for the Japanese market at Idemitsu's Chiba plant. Idemitsu also produces some medical drugs.

== Intellectual property ==
Following a 2009 cross-licensing agreement between LG Display Co., Ltd. and Idemitsu Kosan's OLED materials business, Idemitsu Kosan purchased a 32.73% stake in Global OLED Technology LLC in June 2010. For $100 million, LG purchased Kodak's organic light emitting diode business in December 2009 and created Global OLED Technology to administer and develop a portfolio of 2,200 patents based on Kodak research.

== Other energy sources ==
- A subsidiary, Idemitsu Alaska Inc., held the original permit for the Wishbone Hill coal mine in south-central Alaska, from 1991 to 1995. The permit is currently held by Usibelli Coal Mine, Inc.
- The company owns four coal mines in Australia producing 10 million tons per year.
- It participates in a uranium mine development in Cigar Lake Mine in Canada.
- Idemitsu is working on geothermal power in Ōita Prefecture, Japan. The plant will use a binary power generation system that produces electricity from both the steam with a regular turbine and from hot water by vaporizing pentane which then drives a turbine.
- Together with Mitsubishi Corporation, Idemitsu plans to mass-produce biofuel from non food crops, using a method developed by Honda and the Research Institute of Innovative Technology for the Earth for converting rice straw and weeds to ethanol fuel. The factory will likely be placed in North America, China or Southeast Asia, where the raw materials are available for a low price.

== Advertisement and sponsorship ==
- Idemitsu Museum of Arts, two art museums, in Tokyo and Moji, where Idemitsu & Co. was started.
- Idemitsu Music prize (出光音楽賞, )
- Idemitsu Ihatove Trial (出光イーハトーブトライアル, ), a motorcycle trial
- Ultra Idemitsujin, Ultraman characters used in TV commercials.
- LCR Honda Idemitsu, competing in the MotoGP class of motorcycle racing.
- Title sponsor of the IMSA Idemitsu Mazda MX-5 Cup
