= Sazō Idemitsu =

Japanese businessman

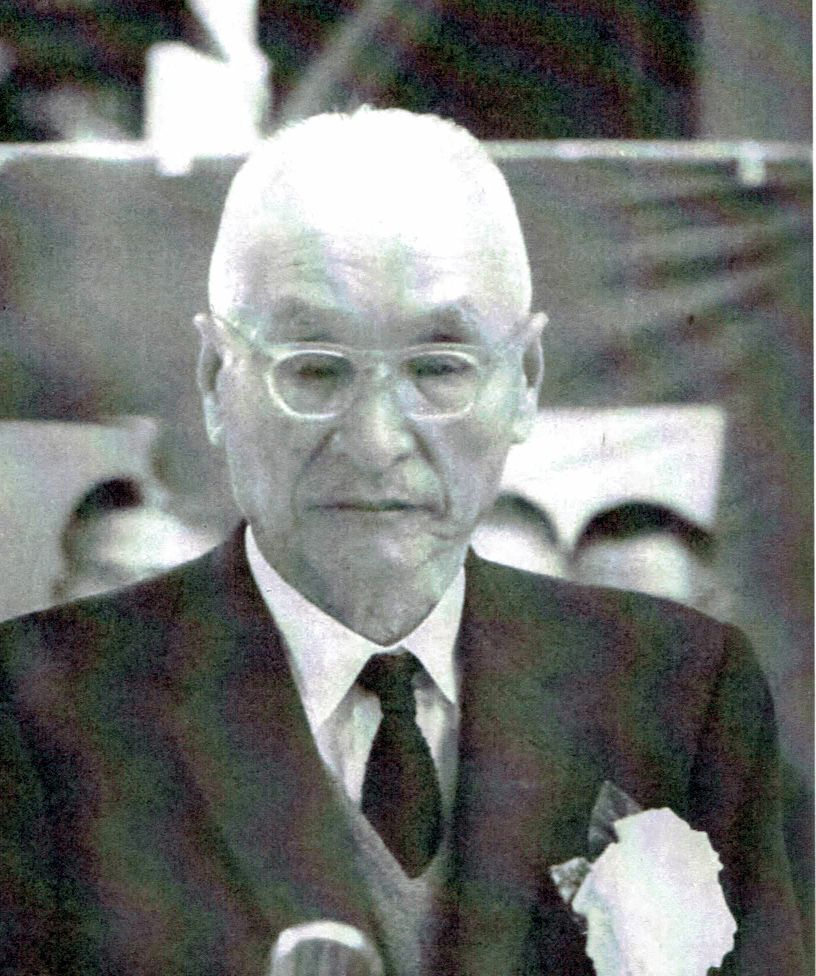

Sazō Idemitsu (出光 佐三, Idemitsu Sazō; August 22, 1885 – March 7, 1981) was a Japanese businessman and founder of the petroleum company Idemitsu Kosan. He graduated from Kobe University (then Kobe Koto Shogyo Gakko). He was also an art collector, especially fond of Sengai Gibon and of Georges Rouault. He is the father of the Japanese experimental video artist, Mako Idemitsu.

== See also ==
- Idemitsu Kosan
- Idemitsu Museum of Arts
- Nissho Maru Incident
