= Idemitsu Museum of Arts =

Art museum in Chiyoda, Tokyo, Japan

Coordinates: 35°40′35.5″N 139°45′38.7″E

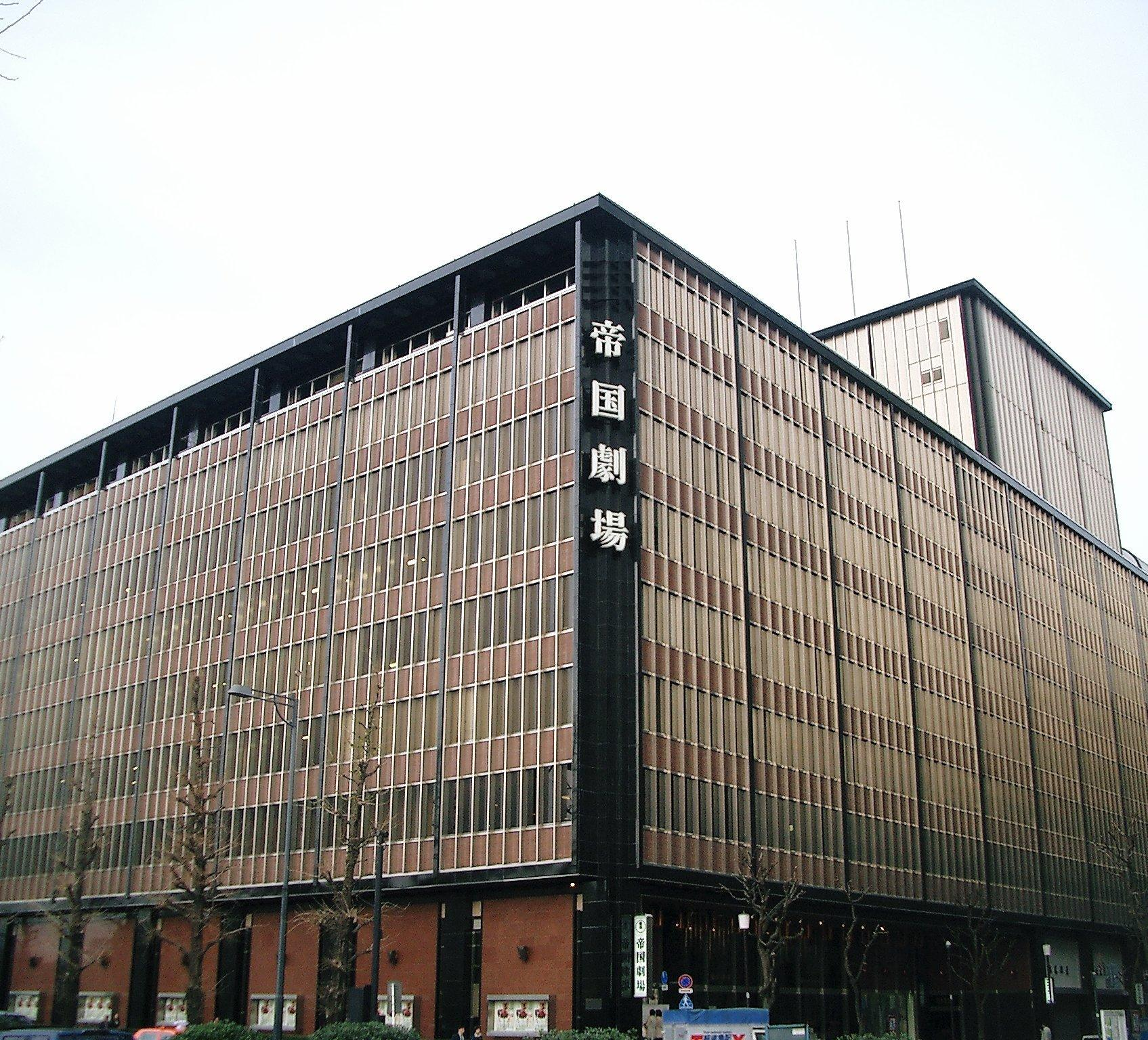
The Idemitsu Museum of Arts in Tokyo, located on the 9th floor of the Teigeki Building, in Marunouchi, Chiyoda, Tokyo

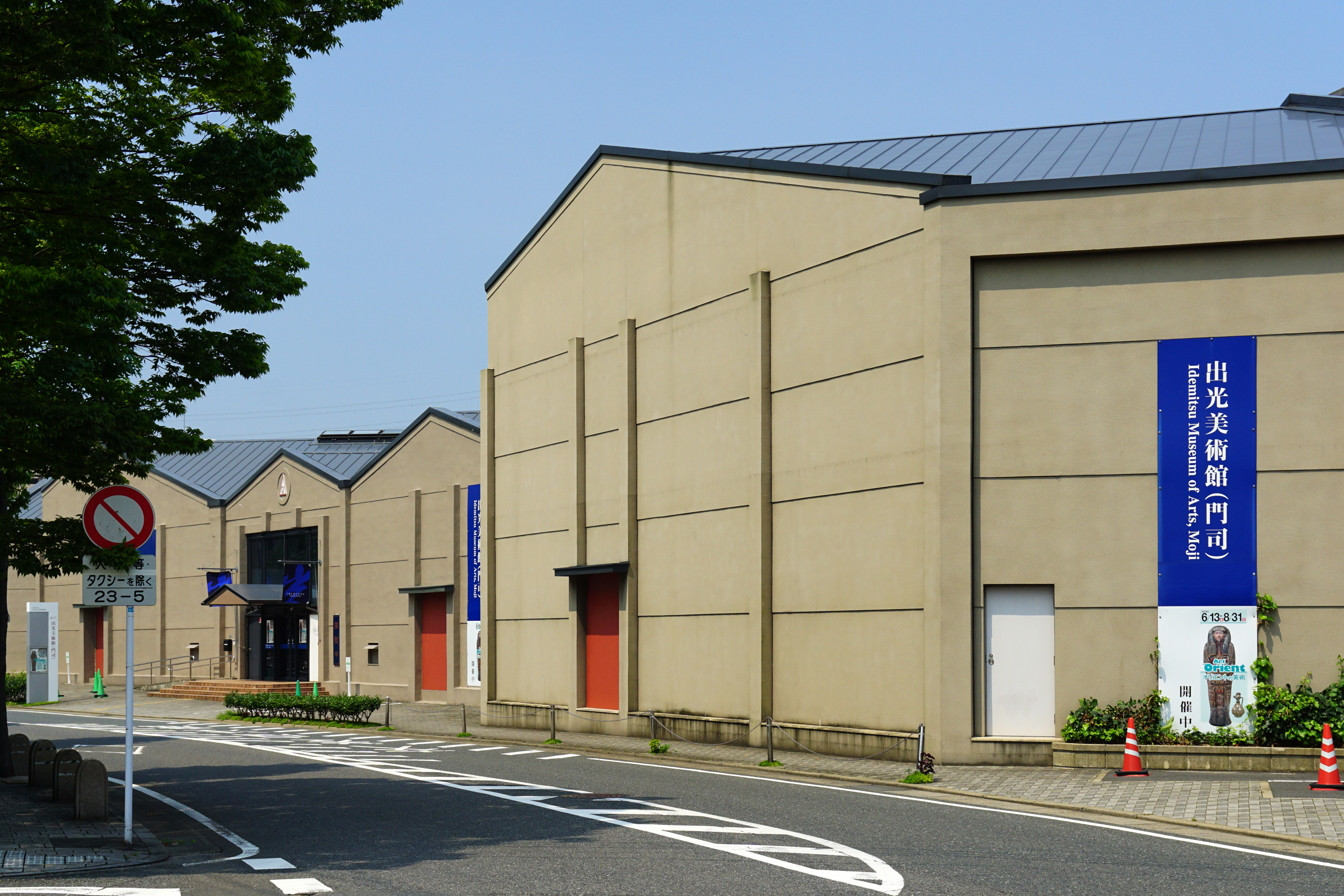
Idemitsu Museum of Arts, Moji

Idemitsu Museum of Arts (出光美術館, Idemitsu Bijutsukan) is an art museum located in the Marunouchi area of Chiyoda, Tokyo. The museum holds only temporary exhibitions featuring its own collection.

The museum is temporarily closed since 25 December 2024 due to the demolition and reconstruction of the Teigeki building, and the reopening date has not been announced.

== History ==
The museum was established to house the art collection of Sazō Idemitsu, founder of the oil company Idemitsu Kōsan (出光興産株式会社), over a period of 70 years. The museum was founded in 1966 and is administered as an incorporated foundation of Idemitsu Kōsan. In 2000, Idemitsu Museum of Arts, Moji (出光美術館(門司), Idemitsu Bijutsukan Moji), a branch of the museum, opened in Mojikō Retro Town (門司港レトロ地区, Mojikō Retoro Chiku), in Moji Ward, Kitakyūshū, Fukuoka Prefecture (福岡県北九州市門司区).

In 2019, the museum purchased 190 works, mostly paintings from the Edo period, from Americans Joe and Etsuko Price. They include Itō Jakuchū's Chōjū kaboku-zu byōbu (鳥獣花木図屏風, Birds and Animals in the Flower Garden), Maruyama Okyo's Tora-zu (虎図, Tiger), and Sakai Hōitsu's Sanjūrokkasen-zu byōbu (三十六歌仙図屏風, The Thirty-six Poetic Immortals), among others. The Price's are world-class collectors of Edo period paintings, and part of their collection has been deposited at the Los Angeles County Museum of Art.

The Teigeki Building, which houses the museum, is aging and will be rebuilt. The museum is scheduled to close once in 2025 and reopen after the construction is completed.

== Collection ==
The collection includes Japanese paintings and East Asian ceramics, with modern works including paintings by Misai Kosugi (Hōan Kosugi) and ceramics by Itaya Hazan. The collection also includes Western paintings by Georges Rouault and Sam Francis.

The museum holds approximately 15,000 cultural properties, of which the Japanese government has designated two as National Treasures and 57 as Important Cultural Properties. One of the National Treasures is the Ban Dainagon Ekotoba (伴大納言絵詞). The museum holds several temporary exhibitions each year.

== See also ==
- List of National Treasures of Japan (paintings)
