= Kobe University =

University in Kobe, Japan

Coordinates: 34°43′41″N 135°14′05″E

- 神戸大学
- Latin: Kobienasis Universitas
- Other name: Shindai (神大)
- Motto: 真摯・自由・協同
- Motto in English: "Integrity – Freedom – Cooperation"
- Type: Public (National)
- Established: March 1902 (as the Kobe Higher Commercial School) (31 May 1949 at reformation of educational system)
- President: Masato Fujisawa
- Faculty: 1,288 full-time (May 1, 2022)
- Students: 15,870 (May 1, 2022)
- Undergraduates: 11,426 (May 1, 2022)
- Postgraduates: 4,444 (May 1, 2022)
- Doctoral students: 1,580 (May 1, 2022)
- Location: Kobe, Hyogo, Japan
- Campus: Urban
- Website: www.kobe-u.ac.jp/en/index.html

Kobe University (神戸大学, Kōbe daigaku), also known in the Kansai region as Shindai (神大), is a national research university located in Kobe, Hyōgo, Japan.

The university was established in 1949, but the academic origins of Kobe University trace back to the establishment of Kobe Higher Commercial School in 1902, which was renamed as Kobe University of Commerce in 1929, and Kobe University of Economics in 1940.

It comprises 14 graduate schools and 11 undergraduate faculties, and has a total enrollment of about 16,000 students in undergraduate and graduate programs. International students accounted for 1,179 members of the student body as of 1 May 2021. The university has 3,102 staff members, including professors, associate professors and administrative officials.

The university is the only university in Japan to have a faculty dedicated to maritime sciences. It was also the first university to establish a faculty dedicated to business administration in the country.

== History ==
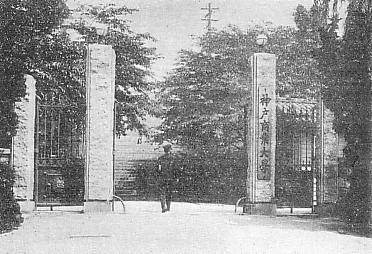
Kobe College of Commerce main gate in 1930s

The roots of the university can be traced back to 1902, when the Kobe Higher Commercial School (神戸高等商業学校, Kōbe kōtō shōgyō gakkō) was established. Its first president was Tetsuya Mizushima (水島銕也; 1864—1928). In 1929 this school was renamed Kobe University of Commerce (神戸商業大学, Kōbe shōgyō daigaku), and it was further renamed in 1944, Kobe University of Economics (神戸経済大学, Kōbe keizai daigaku).

In 1949, under Japan's new educational systems, the university was merged with Hyogo Normal School, Hyogo Junior Normal School, Kobe Technical College and Himeji High School, all of which were in Hyōgo Prefecture, leading to the creation of Kobe University.

The university has since been expanded and has created new faculties to complement its main academic foundations, which have been strongly established in the fields of economics and commerce.

== Organisation ==
=== Undergraduate faculties ===
- Faculty of Letters (文学部)
- Faculty of Global Human Sciences (国際人間科学部)
- Faculty of Law (法学部)
- Faculty of Economics (経済学部)
- Faculty of Business Administration (経営学部)
- Faculty of Science (理学部)
- Faculty of Medicine (医学部)
- Faculty of Engineering (工学部)
- Faculty of System Informatics (システム情報学部)
- Faculty of Agriculture (農学部)
- Faculty of Maritime Sciences (海洋政策科学部)

=== Graduate schools ===
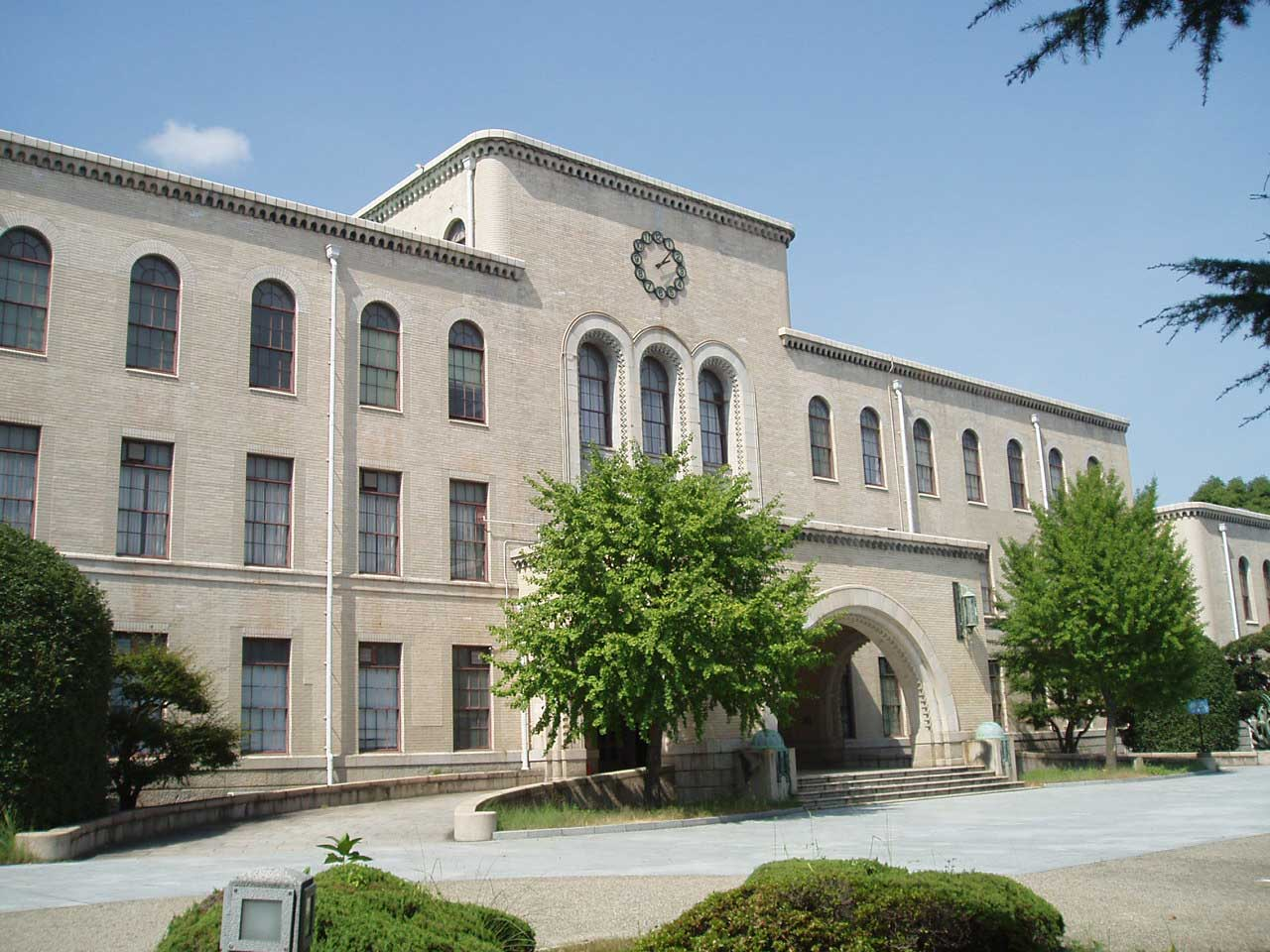
The main building of Kobe University

- Graduate School of Humanities
- Graduate School of Intercultural Studies
- Graduate School of Human Development and Environment
- Graduate School of Law
  - Tier 1 full-time law school
- Graduate School of Economics
  - The Okishio Theorem (Nobuo Okishio) is well known and appreciated worldwide
- Graduate School of Business Administration
  - Tier 1 full-time MBA school
- Graduate School of Science
- Graduate School of Medicine
- Graduate School of Health Sciences
- Graduate School of Engineering
- Graduate School of System Informatics
- Graduate School of Agricultural Science
- Graduate School of Maritime Sciences
- Graduate School of International Cooperation Studies

=== Research institutes ===
- Research Institute for Economics and Business Administration

== Campuses ==
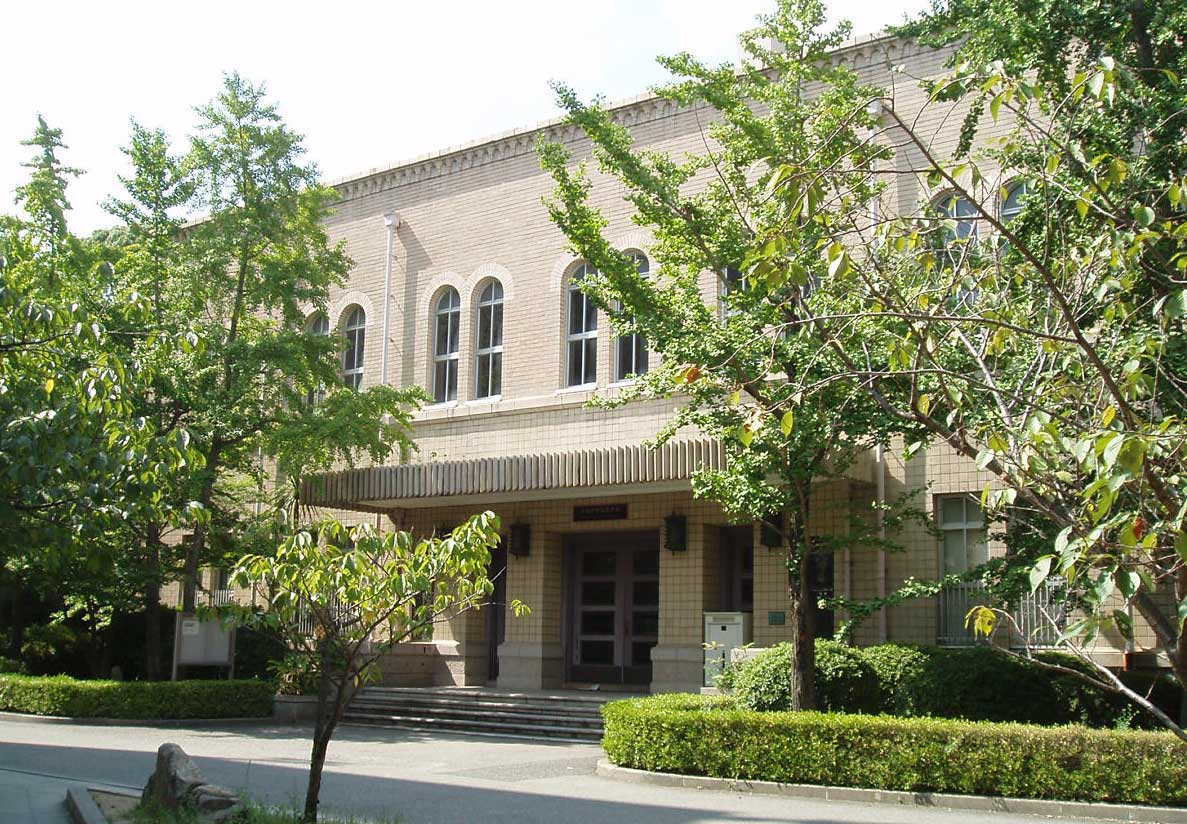
Kobe University Library

The university comprises four campuses: Rokkodai, Kusunoki, Myodani, and Fukae. Rokkodai Campus is the main campus of the university, and nine out of the eleven faculties are located there.

=== Rokkodai area ===
- The First Rokkodai (六甲台第1, Rokkōdai Dai-ichi) Campus

Law, Economics, Business Administration (2-1, Rokkodai, Nada-ku, Kobe)

- The Second Rokkodai (六甲台第2, Rokkōdai Daini) Campus

Letters, Science, Agriculture, Engineering (1-1, Rokkodai, Nada-ku, Kobe)

- The First Tsurukabuto (鶴甲第1, Tsurukabuto Dai-ichi) Campus

Intercultural Studies (1-2-1, Tsurukabuto, Nada-ku, Kobe)

- The Second Tsurukabuto (鶴甲第2, Tsurukabuto Daini) Campus

Human Development (3-11, Tsurukabuto, Nada-ku, Kobe)

=== Kusunoki area ===
- Kusunoki (楠, Kusunoki) Campus

Medicine (7-5-1, Kusunoki, Chūō-ku, Kobe)

=== Myodani area ===
- Myodani (名谷, Myōdani) Campus

Health Sciences (7-10-2, Tomogaoka, Suma-ku, Kobe)

=== Fukae area ===
- Fukae (深江, Fukae) Campus

Maritime Sciences (5-1-1, Fukaeminami, Higashinada-ku, Kobe)

== Academic reputation and rankings ==
University rankings
Global
THE	General	601–800
QS	General	=482
ARWU	Research	501–600

Regional
THE Asia (Asia version)	General	166
QS Asia (Asia version)	General	76
ARWU Asia	Research	44–68

National

QS World University Rankings ranked the university 465th in the world in 2024.

In 2023, THE World University Rankings categorised the university within the 601-800th tier globally, without specifying an exact rank.

=== Popularity and selectivity ===
Shindai is a popular university in Japan. Its admission process is usually considered as selective. It is ranked in top 20 in Japan.

== International education ==
=== Scholarships for international students ===
Kobe university encourages international students to study at the university through a number of scholarships for eligible students. Some of them are:

- Japanese Government Scholarship System
- JASSO/ Honors Scholarship
- Hyogo Prefecture Private Foreign Student Scholarship
- Kobe/Sugawara Scholarship

== Notable alumni ==
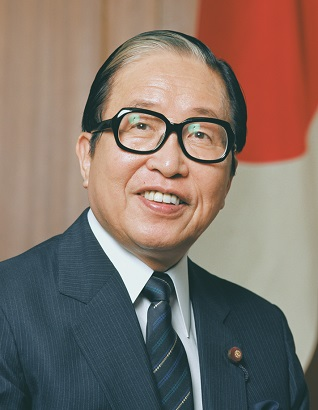
Sōsuke Uno,
75th Prime Minister of Japan

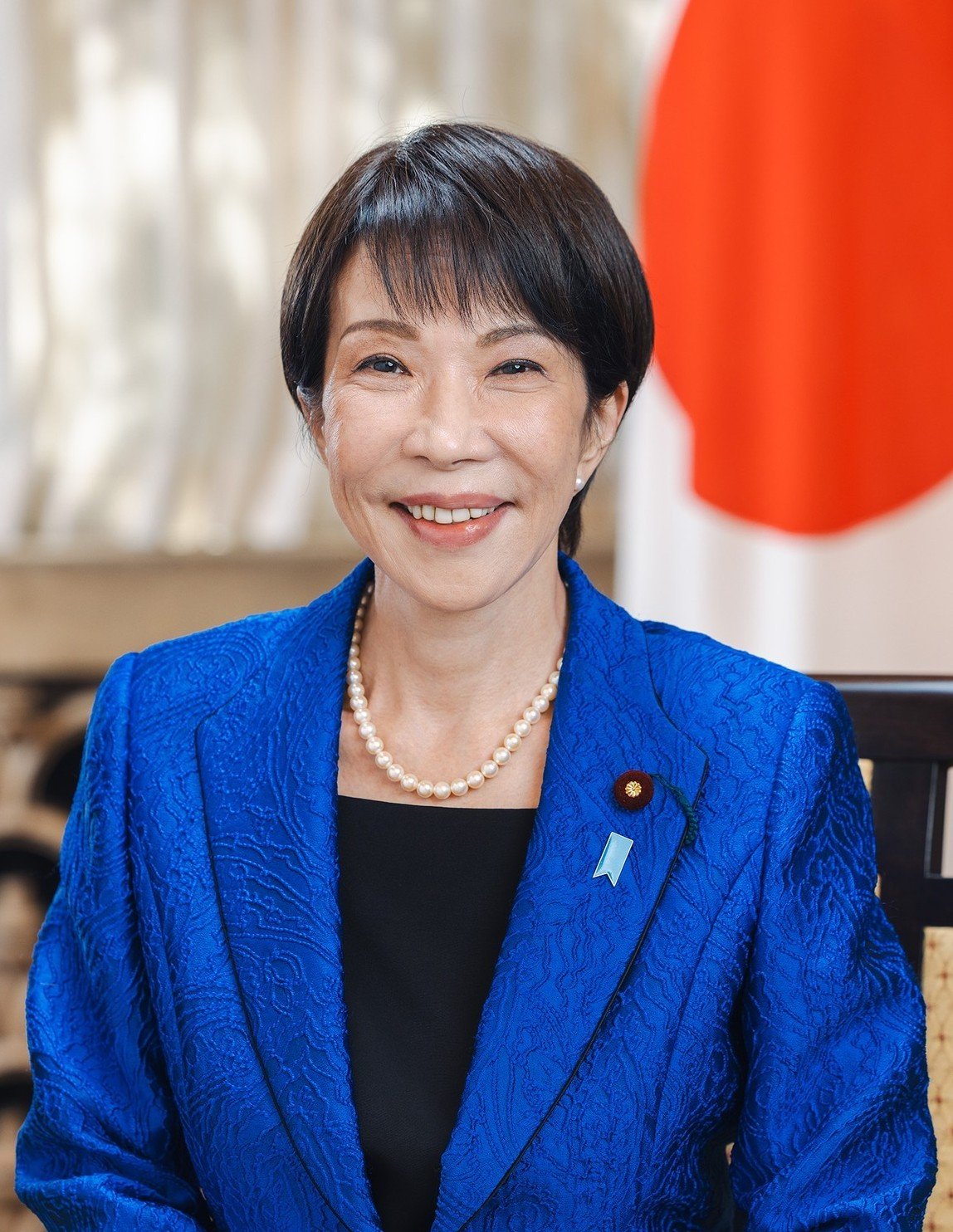
Sanae Takaichi,
104th Prime Minister of Japan

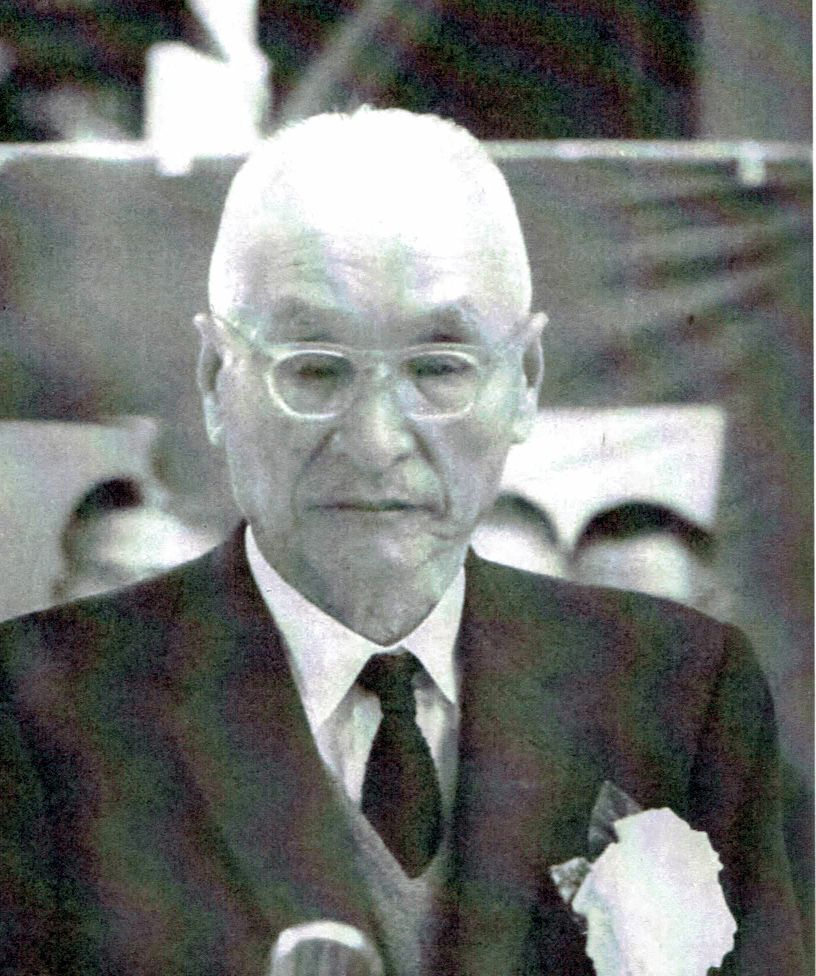
Sazō Idemitsu,
founder, Idemitsu Kosan

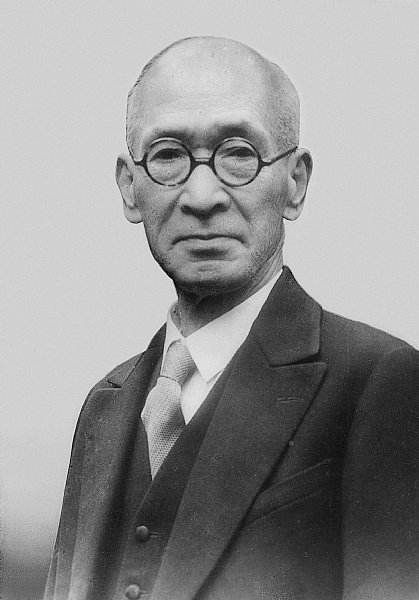
Rizaburo Toyoda,
The first president of Toyota

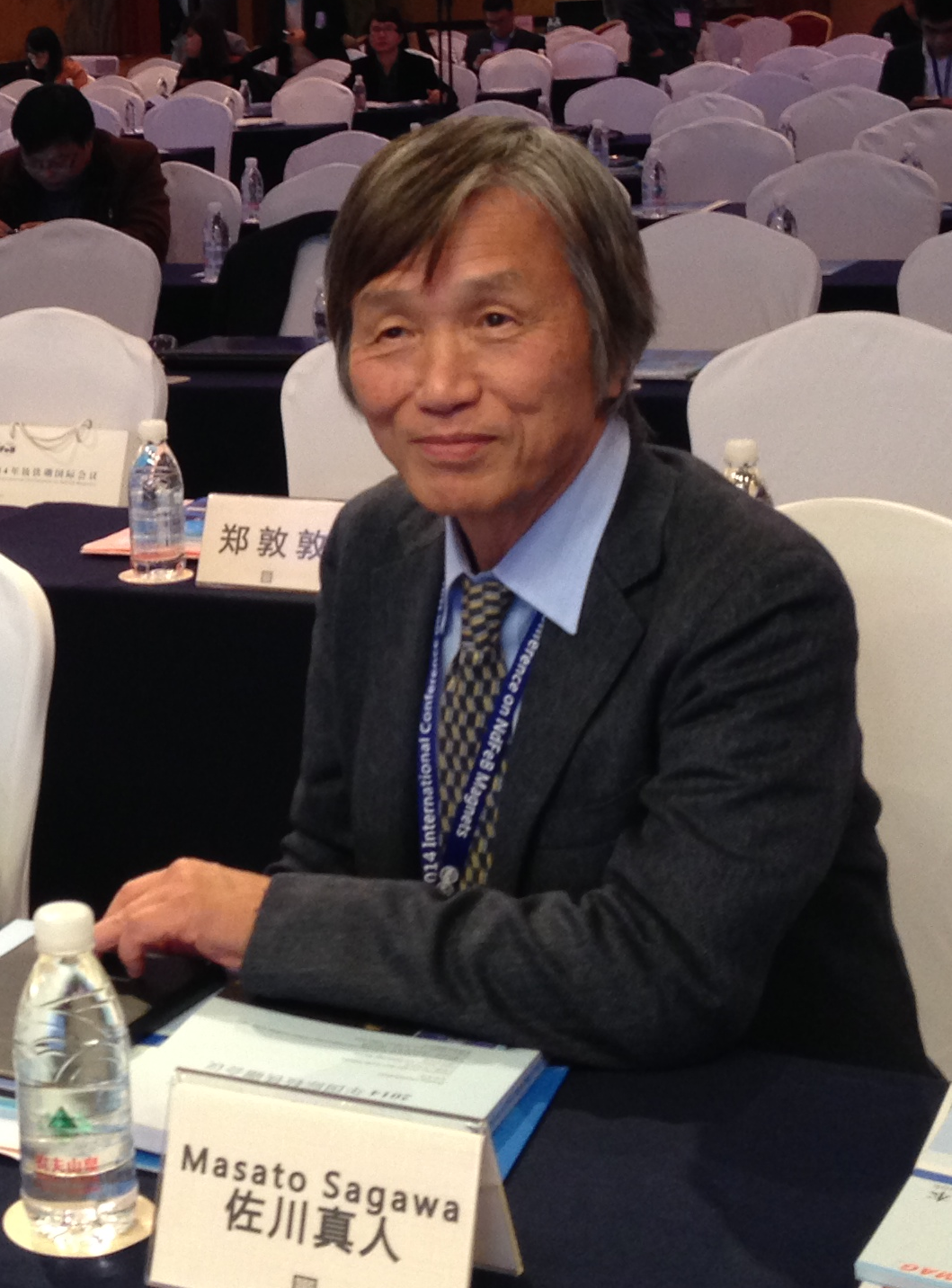
Masato Sagawa,
the 2022 Queen Elizabeth Prize for Engineering laureate

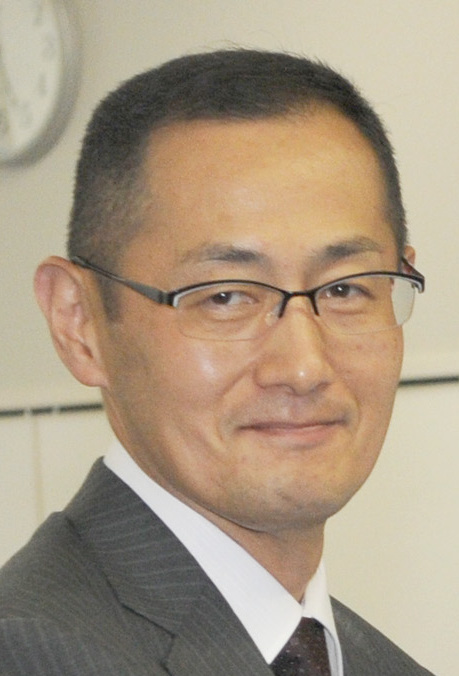
Shinya Yamanaka,
the 2012 Nobel Prize in Physiology or Medicine winner

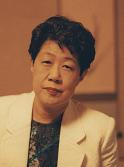
Haruko Wakita,
historical researcher, Order of Culture
- Politics
  - Sōsuke Uno, 75th Prime Minister of Japan
  - Masayuki Naoshima, Minister of Economy, Trade and Industry
  - Sanae Takaichi, 104th Prime Minister of Japan
- Technology
  - Sazō Idemitsu, founder, Idemitsu Kosan
  - Rizaburo Toyoda, founder, the first president of Toyota
  - Tadahiro Sekimoto, recipient of the IEEE Medal of Honor, ex-CEO, NEC.
- Academic
  - Masato Sagawa, Neodymium magnet researcher, awarded the Queen Elizabeth Prize for Engineering in 2022
  - Shinya Yamanaka, stem cell researcher, awarded the Nobel Prize in Physiology or Medicine in 2012
  - Haruko Wakita, historical researcher, Order of Culture in 2010
- Arts
  - Shirin Nezammafi, Iranian writer
  - Shijaku Katsura II, Rakugo performer
  - Kuranosuke Sasaki, Japanese actor
  - Kumi Tanioka, Japanese video game music composer and musician
  - Yasuo Mizui, Sculptor, awarded Ordre des Arts et des Lettres (Commandeur)

== Notable faculty ==
- Yasutomi Nishizuka, biochemist, awarded the Lasker Award in 1989
- Ichiro Fujimori, visiting professor, electrical engineer

== See also ==
- Category:Academic staff of Kobe University
