= Petroleum Association of Japan =

The Petroleum Association of Japan (石油連盟, Sekiyu Renmei, PAJ) is composed of 18 refiners and primary distributors in Japan. It was incorporated in November 1955. It deals with the refining and marketing of petroleum products. It is located in Tokyo.

The PAJ is responsible for activities such as publishing information on issues which are important to the petroleum industry; undertaking various governmental subsidy programs such as research and development; studying and coordinating activities related to issues which are important to petroleum and to provide information on such issues; representing the views or proposals of industry to the government, industrial associations, the media and the general public; and promoting better communication and understanding among member companies.
