= Petrovietnam =

Vietnamese state-owned oil company

Vietnam National Industry - Energy Group

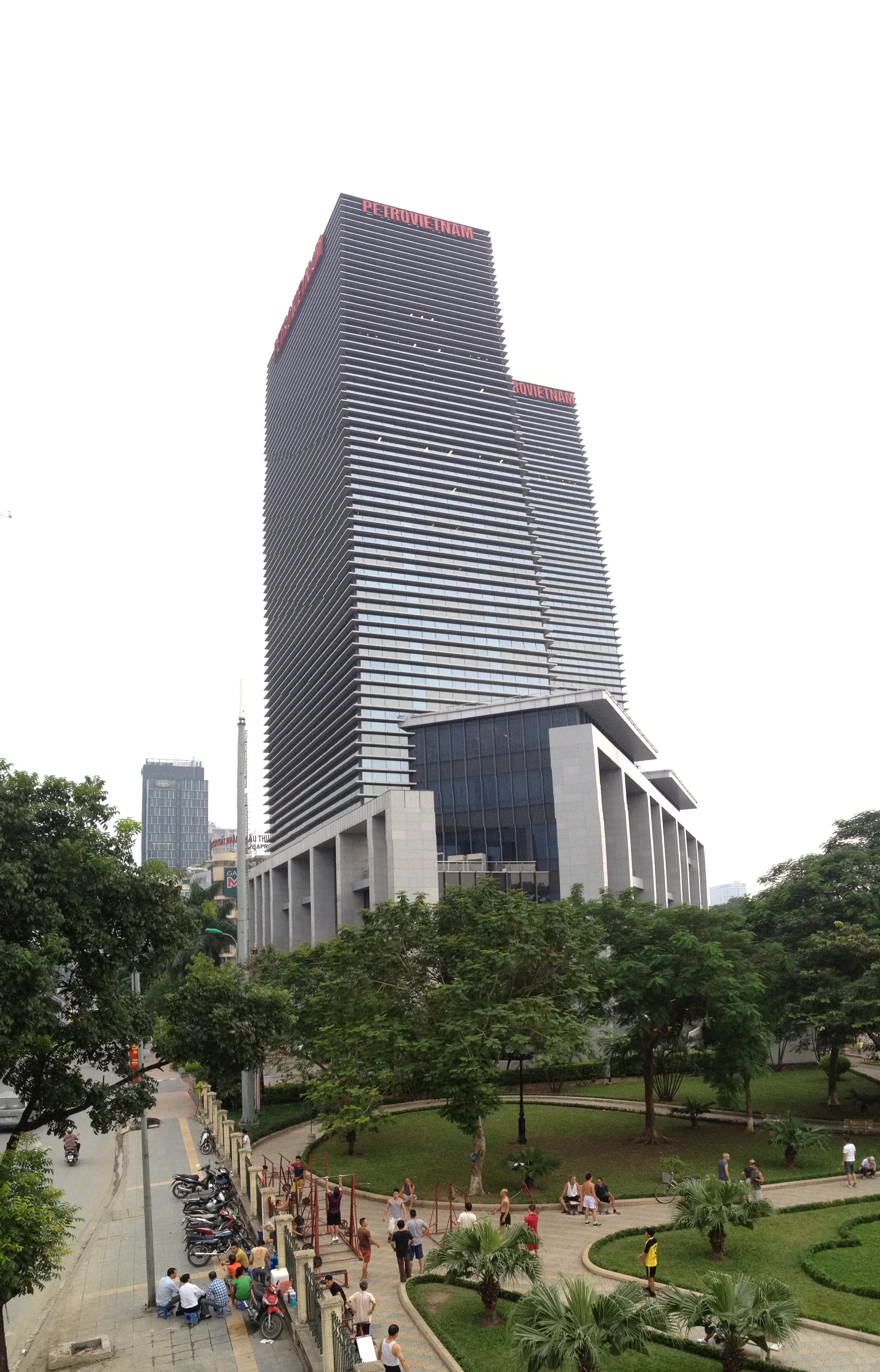
- Headquarters
- Trade name: PETROVIETNAM
- Native name: Tập đoàn Công nghiệp – Năng lượng Quốc gia Việt Nam
- Formerly: Vietnam Oil and Gas Group
- Type: State-owned enterprise
- Traded as: (Subsidiaries): HOSE: PVS; HOSE: PVD; HOSE: PVC; HOSE: BSR
- Industry: Oil and Gas industry Nuclear power and electric power industry Petrochemistry; Financial services
- Founded: 1977; 49 years ago
- Headquarters: Hanoi, Vietnam
- Products: Oil, natural gas, coal, electricity
- Revenue: $37 billion (2012)
- Operating income: $5.4 billion (2012)
- Owner: Government of Vietnam
- Subsidiaries: Vietsovpetro
- Website: www.pvn.vn/sites/en/Pages/default.aspx

Petrovietnam (PVN), formally the Vietnam National Industry - Energy Group (Vietnamese: Tập đoàn Công nghiệp – Năng lượng Quốc gia Việt Nam) and formerly the Vietnam Oil and Gas Group (Tập đoàn Dầu khí Việt Nam or Tập đoàn Dầu khí Quốc gia Việt Nam, 'Vietnam (National) Oil-gas Group'), is the state-owned national oil, gas and energy industry corporation of Vietnam. Petrovietnam has developed since it was established in 1975, and its activities, through its various companies and wholly owned subsidiaries, later cover all the operations from oil and gas exploration and production to storage, processing, transportation, distribution and services. Wholly owned by the Vietnamese central government, it is responsible for all oil and gas resources in the country and has become its country's largest oil producer and second-largest power producer.

== Operations ==
Petrovietnam also carries out exploration activities in Malaysia, Indonesia, Mongolia, Myanmar and Algeria, and recovers oil in Iraq and Malaysia.

== International cooperation ==
In order to help pay for the costs stemming from the Deepwater Horizon explosion, BP plans to sell its stakes in gas and oil properties in Vietnam. It maintains joint ownership of such projects — Lan Tay-Lan Do gas field and Nam Con Son pipeline — with ONGC, Petrovietnam, and ConocoPhillips. Moreover, its partners will be given priority when purchasing its shares should Hanoi approve the transaction. India has expressed interest in buying BP's assets to secure needed energy resources for its fast-growing economy.

In 2010, Petrovietnam Group has secured $1 billion loan from government bond proceeds and BNP Paribas for the Dung Quat oil refinery Plant No 1, in Vietnam, which began operating at 100% production capacity in August 2010.

== Subsidiaries and joint-ventures ==
Petrovietnam has several subsidiaries:

- Petrovietnam Exploration Production Corporation (PVEP)
- Petrovietnam Gas Corporation (PV Gas)
  - Vietnam Steel Gas Pipeline Joint-Stock Corporation (PV Pipe)
- Petrovietnam Oil Corporation (PV Oil)
- Petrovietnam Power Corporation (PV Power)
- Binh Son Refinery Ltd. (BSR)
- Petec Trading and Investment Corporation
- Petrovietnam University (Trường Đại học Dầu khí Việt Nam)

Petrovietnam holds controlling stakes in the following companies:

- Petrovietnam Drilling & Well Services Joint Stock Corporation (PV Drilling)
- Petrovietnam Technical Service Joint Stock Corporation (PTSC)
- Petrovietnam Transportation Joint Stock Corporation (PV Trans)
- Petrovietnam Finance Joint Stock Corporation (PVFC)
- Petrovietnam Insurance Joint Stock Corporation (PVI)
- Petrovietnam General Service Joint Stock Corporation (Petrosetco)
- Petrovietnam Construction Joint Stock Corporation (PVC)
- Petrovietnam Fertilizer and Chemicals Joint Stock Corporation (PVFCCo)
- Drilling Mud Joint Stock Corporation (DMC)
- Joint Venture Vietsovpetro (VSP)
- Petrovietnam Petrochemicals and Fibre Joint Stock Company (PV Tex), a joint-venture set up with textile manufacturer Vinatex to build Vietnam's first polyester fiber plant. The factory will be located in Haiphong and use by-products from oil-refining.
- Vietnam Energy Inspection Joint Stock Company (EIC)
- Phuoc An Port Construction and Investment Joint Stock Company (PAP)
- Petrovietnam Construction Investment Consultant Joint Stock Company (PCIC)

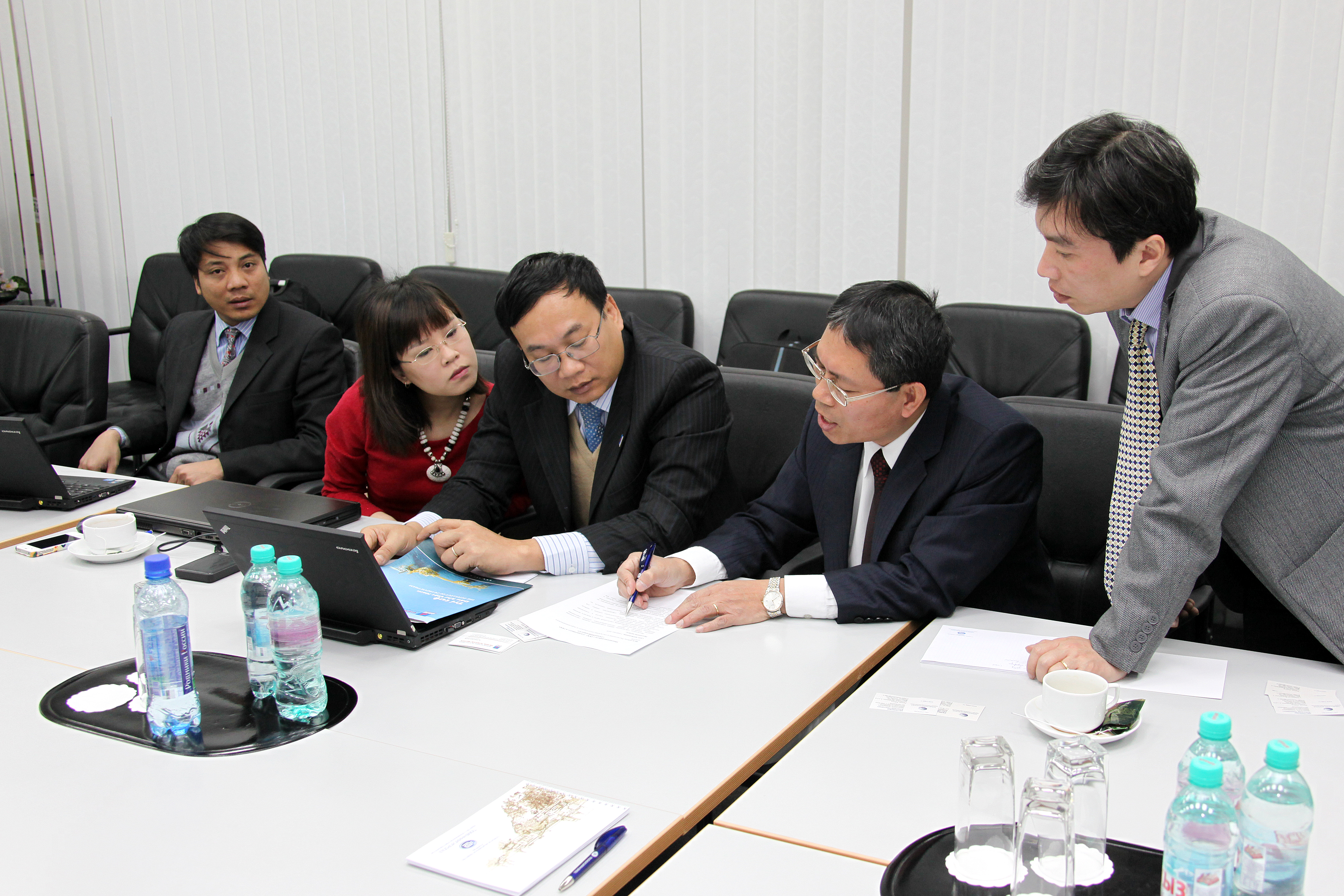
Experts from Petrovietnam work in TyumenNIIgiprogas. Tyumen, Russia. 2014.

Together with Gazprom the company has established Vietgazprom.
