= Long Son Refinery =

Industrial complex in Vietnam

Long Son Petrochemicals Complex is an integrated petroleum and chemical complex constructed on the Long Son Island of Bà Rịa–Vũng Tàu province, Vietnam. It is the first integrated petrochemical complex in the country, commissioned in 2023. Covering an area of 460 hectares, the Long Son Refinery has a capacity of 200,000 barrels a day. The project had met with several delays regarding site clearance.
