= Robert Williams (geometer) =

American designer, mathematician and architect

Robert Edward Williams
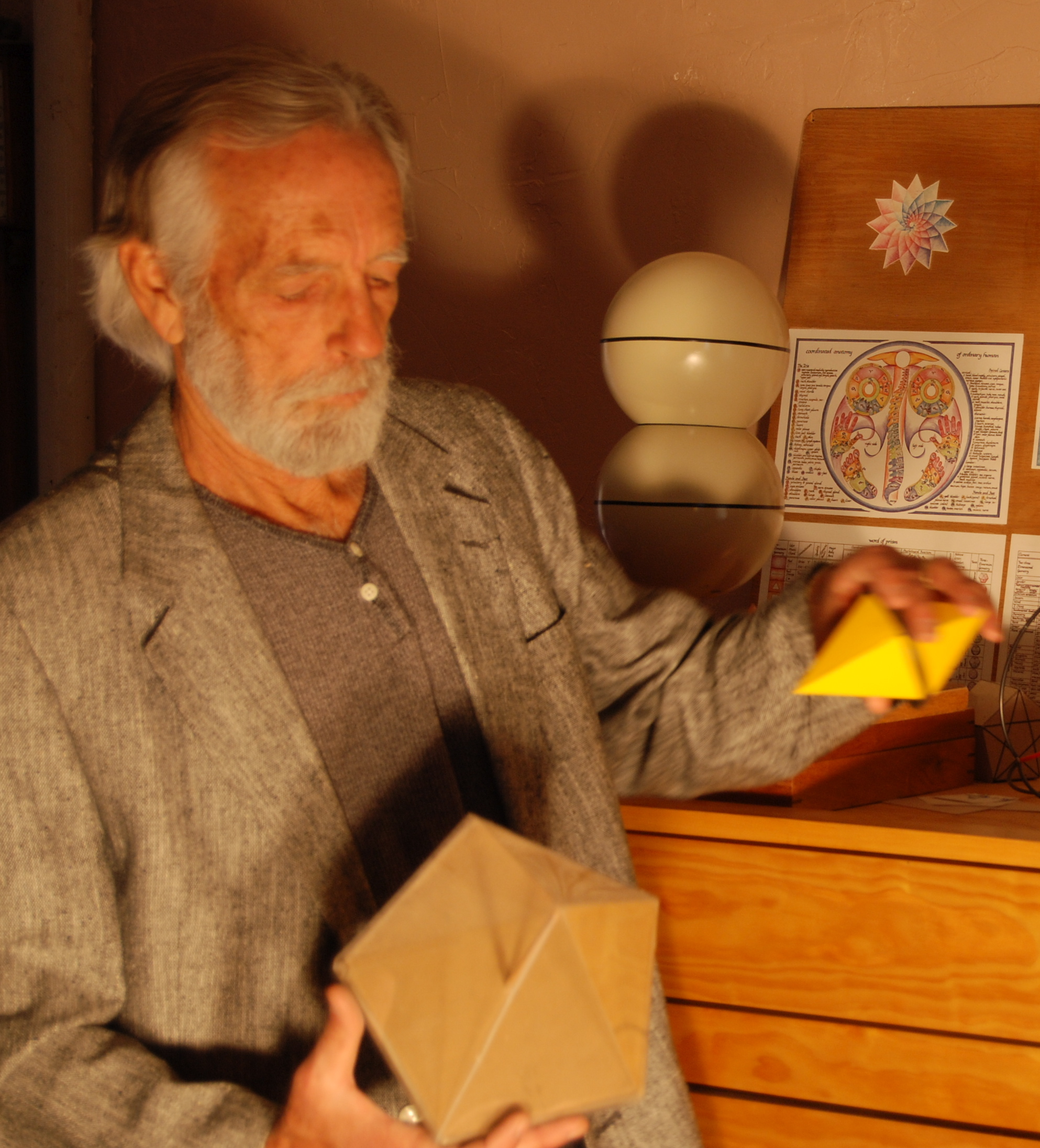
- Born: 1942 (age 83–84); Cincinnati, Ohio
- Education: California State University Northridge Southern Illinois University
- Scientific career
- Fields: Designer, Mathematician, Architect
- Workplaces: McDonnell-Douglas Advanced Research Laboratories, Southern Illinois University, Eudaemon Institute, Mandala Design Associates.

Robert Edward Williams (born 1942) is an American designer, mathematician, and architect. He is noted for books on the geometry of natural structure, the discovery of a new space-filling polyhedron, the development of theoretical principles of Catenatic Geometry, and the invention of the Ars-Vivant Wild-life Protector System for repopulating the Western Mojave Desert in California, USA with desert tortoises.

== Biography—life, theories, and work ==
Robert Williams was born in Cincinnati, Ohio, the son of Robert Finley Williams and Edna Rita Brotherton. His father was the oldest member of the Williams Brothers, a quartet of musical entertainers, who appeared on recordings, radio, and television, from the late 1930s to the present.

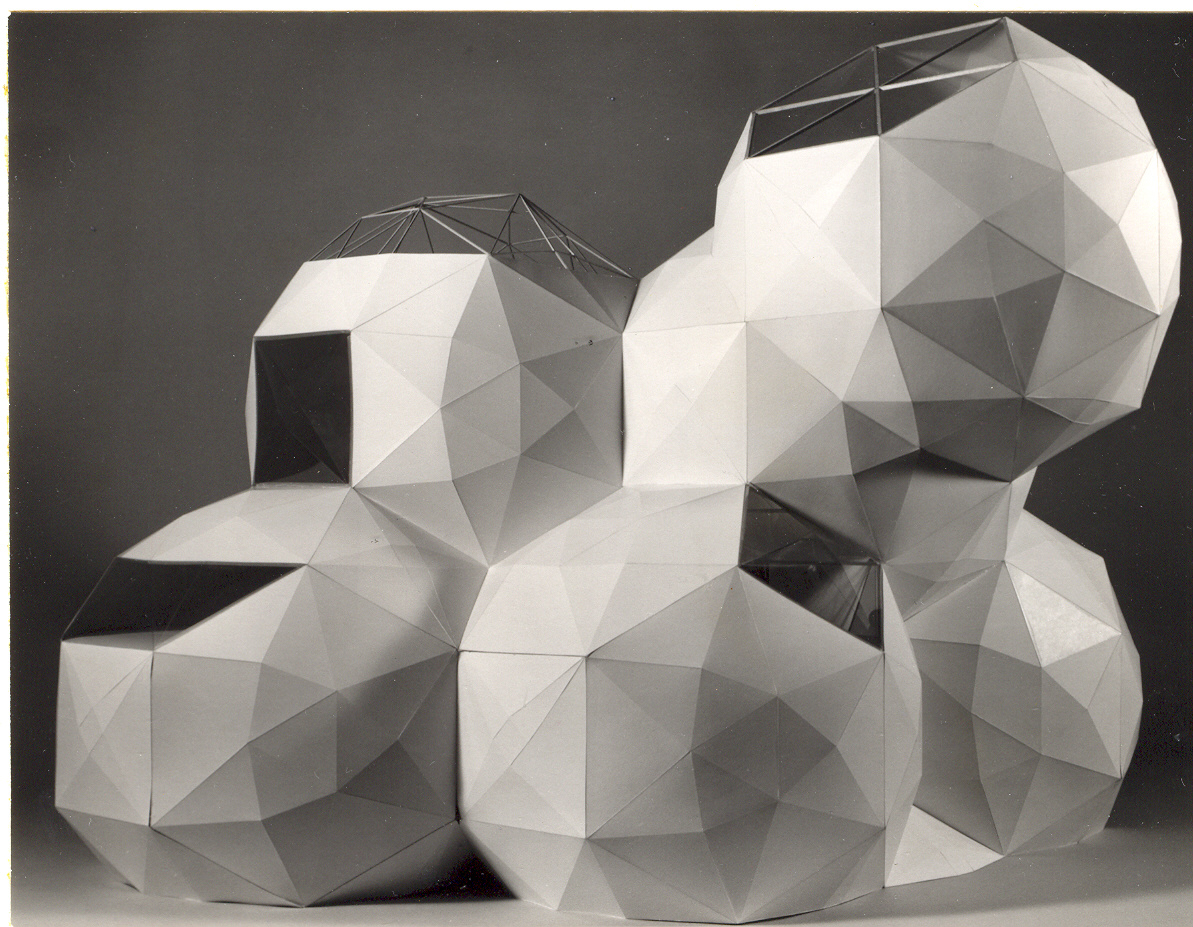
An example of a clustered triangulated structure based upon small circuit principles of Catenatic Geometry.

Williams's work was originally inspired by the design principles in natural structure systems promoted by R. Buckminster Fuller. He was introduced to the work of Fuller by designer Peter Pearce in 1963. He finished graduate studies in structural design at Southern Illinois University in 1967, where Fuller was University Professor. While at SIU, he invented a system of clustering dome structures by using small circle Catenatic Geometry principles rather than great circles, or geodesics, as Fuller had designed into geodesic dome structures. From his research with naturally packed cell systems (biological cells, soap bubble packings, and metal crystallites) he also discovered a new space-filling polyhedron, the β-tetrakaidecahedron, the faces of which closely approximate the actual distribution of the kinds of faces found in experimental samples of cell geometry in natural systems.

Williams met astronomer, Albert George Wilson at the Rand Corporation in 1966. Wilson invited him to conduct research at the McDonnell-Douglas Corporation Advanced Research Laboratories (DARL) in Huntington Beach, California, USA. After graduate studies, he joined Dr. Wilson in September 1967 and continued his research into general structure principles in natural systems. He was the geometry and structure consultant to NASA engineer, Charles A. Willits, on the initiatory work in the development of large scale structure systems for space stations. The first of four editions of his structural geometry research was published by DARL in 1969, with the title:Handbook of Structure. His paper in the journal Science proposed that his discovery of the β-tetrakaidecahedron is the most reasonable alternative to Lord Kelvin's α-tetrakaidecahedron.

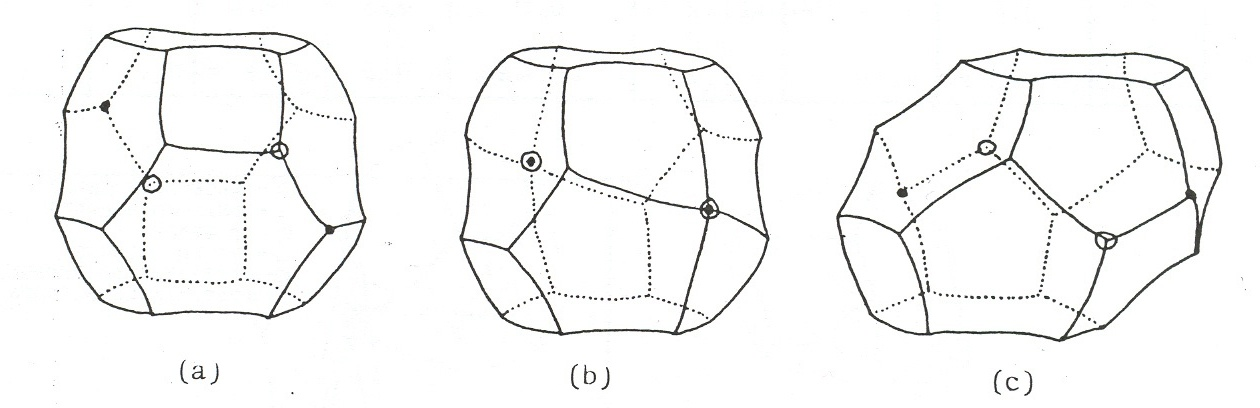
Topological transformation from the Lord Kelvin α-tetrakaidecahedron (a) to the Williams β-tetrakaidecahedron (c), having 8 pentagons, 4 hexagons, and 2 square faces.

As an organizer and presenter at the First International Conference on Hierarchical Structures sponsored by DARL in 1968, Williams was an early proponent advocating the discipline of Hierarchical Structure to be a legitimate area of scientific research. In the spring of 1970, Williams became a visiting lecturer in Design at Southern Illinois University. A year later he returned to California, and started the design company Mandala Design Associates. In 1972, Eudaemon Press published Natural Structure: Toward a Form Language, an expanded edition of the original Handbook of Structure. In 1979, Dover Publications published the third edition titled, The Geometrical Foundation of Natural Structure, in its series of classical explanations of science. These works are cited in many books on geometry, science, and design. Numerous references to these works are found in geometry articles in Wikipedia and Mathworld.

On the fortieth anniversary of the initial DARL publication, Eudaemon Press published a commemorative 40th anniversary edition: The Geometry of Natural Structure: A Language of Form Source Book for Scientists and Designers. As a companion volume, Eudaemon Press also published Williams's recent work: The Kiss Catenatic: The Introduction of Catenatic Geometry and its Environs.

== Environmental design work ==
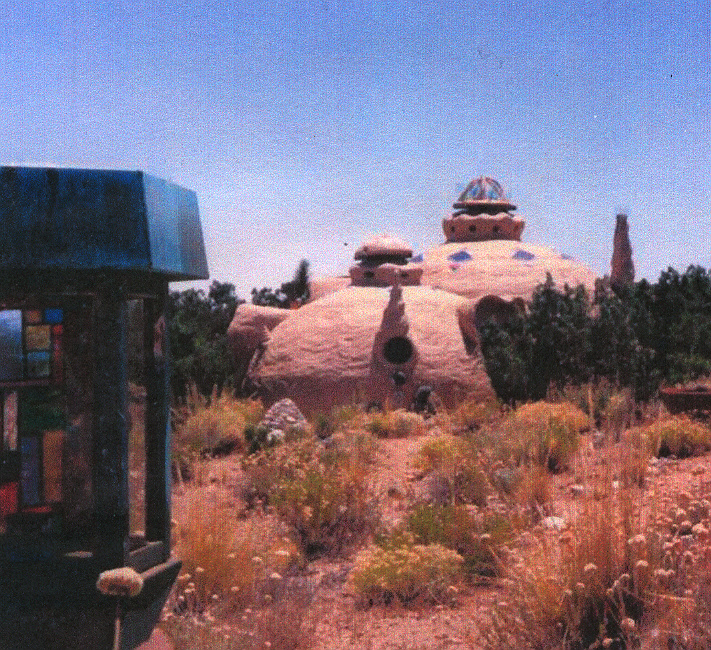
Ferro-cement experimental architecture based on principles of Catenatic Geometry: Mojave Desert, California,

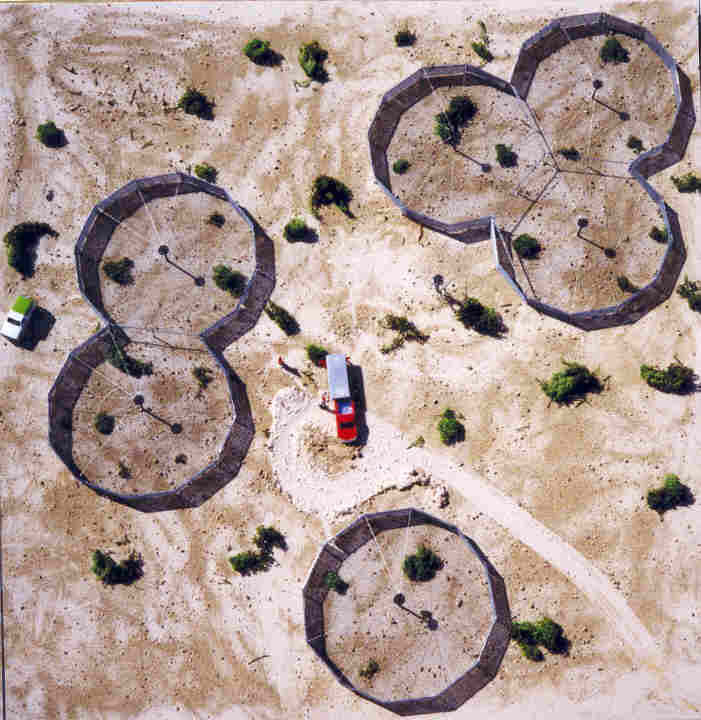
Structural-spatial configurations of the Ars-Vivant desert tortoise nurseries—Edwards Air Force Base, California, USA. 2004

Williams uses the geometry of Natural Structure, Catenatic Geometry principles, and Symbolic analysis as fundamental components of his architectural, environmental design, and cosmology work. In 1967, he became a charter member of Experiments in Art and Technology(E.A.T.) founded by engineers Billy Klüver and Fred Waldhauer and artists Robert Rauschenberg and Robert Whitman. In addition to theoretical work, Williams was awarded U.S. Patent No. 6,532,701] in 2003 for a shelter system of clustered modular enclosures. He designed and constructed 18,000 square feet (1,700 m^{2}) of these modular, moveable, expandable-contractible enclosures to raise the endangered desert tortoise (Gopherus agassizii) at the Fort Irwin Military Reservation and Edwards Air Force Base in California, USA. Of all of Williams' design and architectural work, he considers his association with biologists, David Morafka and Kenneth Nagy to repopulate the Western Mojave Desert with the desert tortoise as his most rewarding environmental design work.

== Catenatic Geometry and Sacred Geometry ==
In both his books and lectures, Williams is a keen popularizer of the geometries in natural structures and how they can be used in environmental design. His current work focuses on two concepts first introduced in Natural Structure: Toward a Form Language.

=== Catenatic Geometry ===
Following the lead of mathematicians L. Fejes Tóth and C. A. Rogers, Williams formalized the concepts underlying Catenatic Geometry. In The Kiss Catenatic he expanded the concept of small circles covering a sphere to include interconnected platen circuits that model multi-level linked units of the 3-dimensional matrix chain. He presented examples of the use of Catenatic Geometry in discussions of dark matter and dark energy, red-shift, fundamental forces, discrete units of space, and the expansion of the universe.

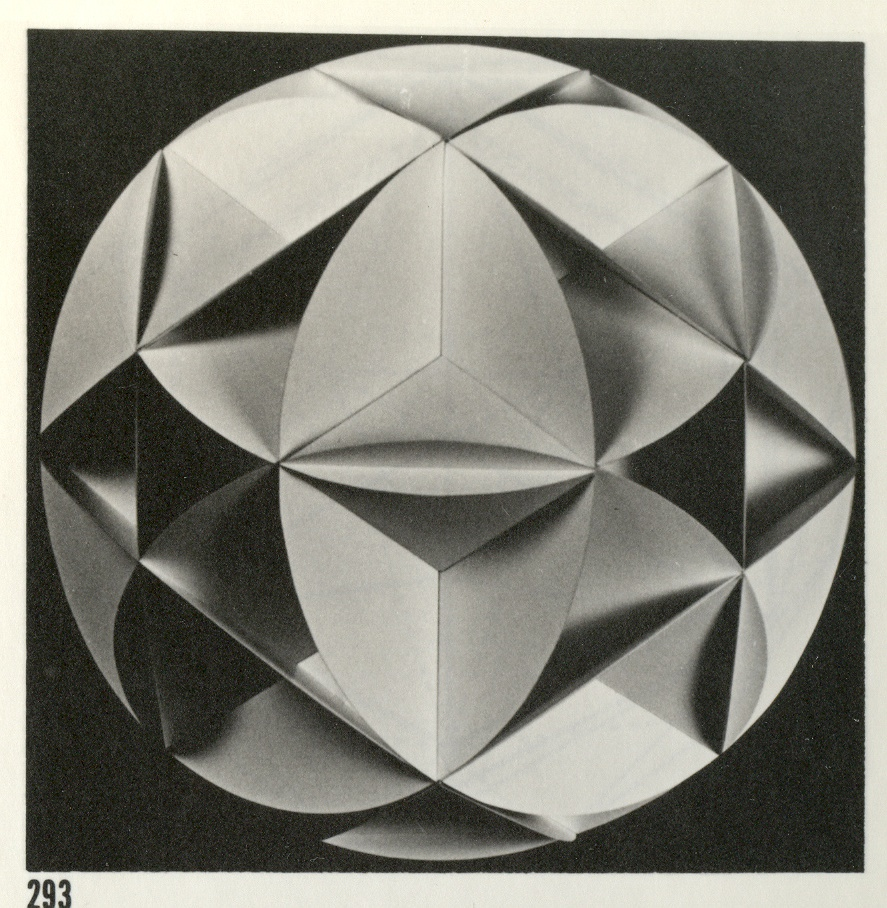
Photo of intersecting small circuit boundaries that form the conceptual basis for Catenatic Geometry.

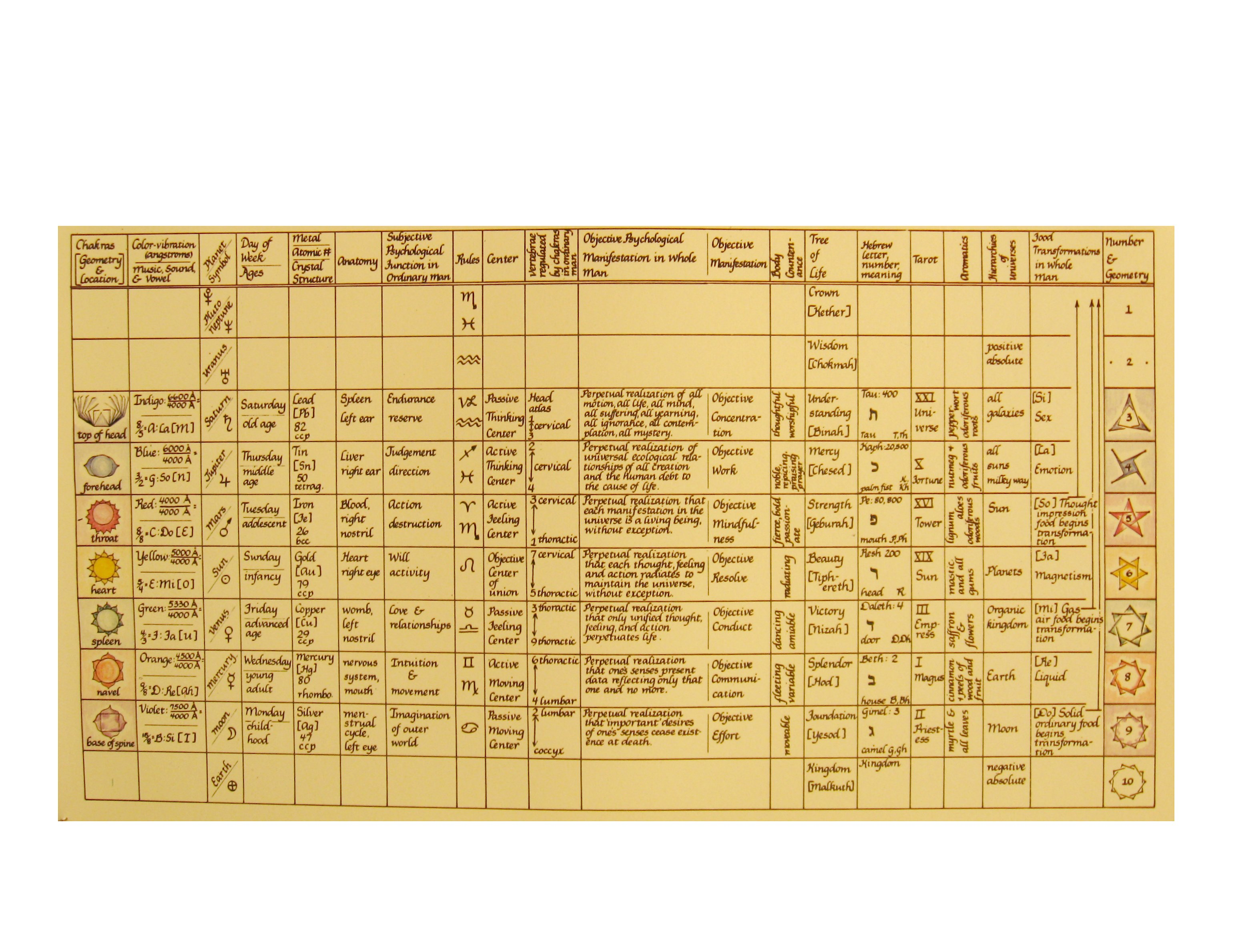
One of six Cosmology Charts: Law of Seven

=== Sacred Geometry ===
From the beginning of his geometry research, Williams considered polyhedral geometry as the basis of a Form Language comprising three levels: the Formative (geometry), the Purportive (psychology), and the Symbolic. With respect to the symbolic Level, he followed the lead of symbologist and mythographer Robert Lawlor. In The Integration of Universal Constants Williams presented relationships among numerous diverse subjects: geometric form, color spectrum, the music octave, the periodic table, astronomy, astrology, psychology, tarot, chakras, gender, seasons of the year, among others. The relationships are depicted in six integrated cosmology charts.

== Publications ==
- 1967. Geometry, Structure, Environment. Masters Thesis. Carbondale: Southern Illinois University.
- 1968. Handbook of Structure. McDonnell-Douglas Advanced Research Laboratories. Research Communication 75.
- 1972. Natural Structure: Toward a Form Language. Moorpark, California: Eudaemon Press.
- 1978. The Geometrical Foundation of Natural Structure. New York: Dover Publications, Inc. ISBN 0-486-23729-X.
- 2009. The Geometry of Natural Structure (40th Anniversary Edition). San Francisco: Eudaemon Press. ISBN 978-0-9823465-1-8
- 2009. The Kiss Catenatic: The Introduction of Catenatic Geometry and its Environs. San Francisco: Eudaemon Press. ISBN 978-0-9823465-2-5
- 2009. The Integration of Universal Constants. San Francisco: Eudaemon Press. ISBN 978-0-9823465-0-1.
- 2020. Concealed Symmetry: Modulators Within Universal Process. Santa Paula: Eudaemon Press. ISBN 978-0-9823465-5-6.
- 2025. A Basic Approach to the Unity Underlying the Fundamental Constants of Nature. Santa Paula: Eudaemon Press.

== U. S. Patent Office publications ==
- "Shelter system of clustered modular enclosures". U.S. Patent 6,532,701 (March 18, 2003).
- "A Unified Method and System for Multi-Dimensional Mapping of Spatial-Energy Relationships Among Micro- and Macro-Events in the Universe". U.S. Patent Application No. 10/714,142, Publication No. US-2005-0143919-A1 (June 30, 2005).
