= Hakudō Kobayashi =

Japanese artist

Hakudō Kobayashi (小林はくどう, Kobayashi Hakudō; July 2, 1944) is a Tokyo-based artist working in video and sculpture. He is best known for his work as a promoter of citizen video work. Kobayashi is also Representative Director of the NPO Shimin ga Tsukuru TVF (Community-made TVF) which runs the annual Tokyo Video Festival. He taught at Seian University of Art and Design from 1992-2010.

== Biography ==
Kobayashi was born Kobayashi Hiromichi (an alternate reading of the characters in his name) in Sendai City, Miyagi Prefecture, Japan in 1944. He moved to Tokyo to attend Tama Art University, graduating from the Department of Oil Painting under Yoshihige Saitō in 1967.

In the leadup to Expo '70, Kobayashi worked with Goji Hamada, Kazuo Kawasumi, Masanobu Yoshimura, Yasuharu Yukino, and Tanaka Norio as the design firm Kantsū (Penetration), which produced the ABAB Akafudado store in Ueno, and a collaborative project at Expo '70, among other projects. Kobayashi and Kantsū also worked as part of Masanobu Yoshimura's team producing ravens and other objects for the Textiles Pavilion at Expo '70].

After picking up the medium of video in 1972, Kobayashi first taught video for the Yokohama-based alternative art academy B-Zemi starting in 1973. From 1975 he taught at Tama Gakuen College of the Arts (Tama Geijutsu Gakuen), and a series of other schools until joining the faculty of Seian University of Art and Design in 1992, where he stayed until 2010.

From the late 1970s on, Kobayashi was also involved in various initiatives, festivals, publications, and programming promoting citizen video, community video, and amateur video. Since 1979 he has worked in various capacities with the annual Tokyo Video Festival, under the aegis of Japan Victor from 1979-2009, and then under the NPO Shimin ga Tsukuru TVF (Community-made TVF) since 2010. Kobayashi is currently the Representative Director of NPO Shimin ga Tsukuru TVF.

== Artistic Activities ==
Kobayashi first gained attention for his Hakudo Machine series: mobile reliefs, sculptures, and installations draped in fabric, animated by simple gears, chains, and motors. The series, which ran from 1967–70, was included in the 1969 Trends in Contemporary Art exhibition at the Museum of Modern Art, Kyoto and outside the Mitsui Pavilion at Osaka's Expo '70.

Kobayashi was a founding member, alongside Fujiko Nakaya and Yūji Morioka, of Experiments in Art and Technology Tokyo (est. 1971), a branch of the international collective founded in New York by Billy Klüver, Fred Waldhauer, Robert Rauschenberg, and Robert Whitman. Their first project was the Tokyo branch of Utopia Q&A, 1981, a telex network that connected nodes in New York, Stockholm, Ahmedabad, and Tokyo as part of the Moderna Museet's Utopias & Visions 1871-1981 organized by Pontus Hultén. The Tokyo branch of the project was presented at the Xerox Knowledge-In, Sony Building, Ginza from July 30-September 30, 1971. It was organized as a kind of quasi-newsroom that would display incoming and outgoing telex messages from the other nodes of the project and served as a base of operations for daily translations of messages between English (the language used at the other site) and Japanese. Kobayashi and the other organizers also reached out to different local intellectuals and media figures to solicit questions and answers for the project.

From February 1972 through its dissolution in 1975, Kobayashi joined Nakaya, Katsuhiro Yamaguchi, Nobuhiro Kawanaka, Rikurō Miyai, Masao Kōmura, Michitaka Nakahara, Kyoko Michishita, Shoko Matsushita, Sakumi Hagiwara, Toshio Matsumoto, and others in activities under the collective name of Video Hiroba. Kobayashi was one of the core members of the group, and participated in their major exhibitions and community projects including Video Communication: Do-It-Yourself-Kit (1972, Sony Building, Ginza), Video Week: Open Retina—Grab Your Image (1972, American Center, Nagata-cho), Tokyo-New York Video Express (1974, Tenjo Sajiki Theater, Shibuya), the Karuizawa Video Game Festival (1974, Karuizawa, Japan), the Research for New and Existing Residents' Participation (1973, Sakuragi-cho and Noge-cho, Yokohama), and the Video Community Center project at Tohoku Electric Power Company's Niigata branch office (1973). Kobayashi further supported the production of other works by Fujiko Nakaya, helping her record her 1972 video Friends of Minamata Victims—Video Diary and serving as part of a team that recorded videos for her 1973 project Old People's Wisdom—Cultural DNA.

Kobayashi's individual works tend to fall into two categories: media animations or sequential video feedback performances. His media animations, such as Earth (1974), subject still or moving images to mediation by synthesizers such as the Scanimate at IMAGICA Ltd. His sequential video feedback performances involve re-recording practices, sometimes with individuals performing next to monitors featuring videos he has previously recorded of other performances to create a mise-en-abyme effect, and sometimes with compilations of individuals who attempt to recreate previous footage in the compilation sequence through performance. Such works include Catch Video (1975), Play/Catch Video (1975), Lapse Communication (1972-1980), and Aqua Works (1975–78, 2015).

== Community Video Activism ==
Since his days in Video Hiroba, community collaboration and promotion of citizen video have been central to Kobayashi's practice. In 1978 Kobayashi moved to the city of Kunitachi in the western suburbs of Tokyo. He was contracted by the city of Kunitachi to produce a series of videos, using equipment provided by the city, that would be used as a means of promoting critical discussion and debates around issues of local interest. According to the organizers of the 2005 NTT InterCommunication Center exhibition Possible Futures: Japanese Postwar Art and Technology, the project was aimed at "utilizing video as a medium for 'publicizing' the opinions of citizens rather than a medium for government 'public relations,' so it can be said that it was an attempt to destroy the hierarchical structure between those who are in a position to voice their opinions and those who are not." The Tokyo Video Festival, which Kobayashi has contributed to in different roles over the years, including as a judge and as the current Representative Director, similarly places videos by amateurs alongside professionals in an international competition that includes shorts, feature films, documentaries, and fiction. From the late 1970s, Kobayashi produced various publications aimed at generalist, amateur, and youth audiences, including publications for NHK, the weekend edition of the Nikkei Newspaper (Nikkei Shimbun), and the children's book publisher Librio Publishing (Riburio Shuppan).

== Exhibitions of Note ==
- Two-man show with Nobuo Sekine, Tsubaki Kindai Gallery, Tokyo
- The 9 Visual Points Exhibition, Muramatsu Gallery, Tokyo, 1968
- Hakudō Machine, Walker Gallery, 1968 (solo exhibition)
- Trends in Japanese Contemporary Art, National Museum of Modern Art, Kyoto, 1969
- Hakudō Machine, Mitsui Pavilion, Expo '70, Osaka, 1970
- Experiments in Art and Technology's Utopia Q&A, 1981, Sony Building, Ginza, 1971
- Video Communication: Do-It-Yourself-Kit, Sony Building, Ginza, Tokyo, 1972
- Tokyo-New York Video Express, Tenjo Sajiki Theater, Tokyo, 1974
- Tokyo Biennale 1974, Tokyo Metropolitan Art Museum, Tokyo, 1974
- Video Art, Institute of Contemporary Art, Philadelphia; The Contemporary Arts Center, Cincinnati; Museum of Contemporary Art, Chicago; Wadsworth Atheneum, Hartford, 1975
- Seventh International Open Encounter on Video, Fundacio Joan Miró, Barcelona, 1977
- Japan Video Art Festival, Centro de Arte y Comunicación, Buenos Aires, 1978
- Tenth International Open Encounter on Video, Sogetsu Hall, Tokyo, 1978
- Video from Tokyo to Fukui and Kyoto, Museum of Modern Art, New York, 1979
- Biennale of Sydney, Australia, 1982
- Videonale, Bonn, Germany, 1988
- Hakudō Video Jungle, Kirin Plaza, Osaka, 1990 (solo exhibition)
- Video, A New World—the Possibilities of that Media, O Art Museum, Tokyo, 1992
- Japanese Art After 1945: Scream Against the Sky, Guggenheim Museum SoHo, New York and Yokohama Museum of Art, Yokohama, 1994
- Possible Futures: Japanese Postwar Art and Technology, NTT InterCommunication Center, Tokyo, 2005
- Retrospective Exhibition of the Early Video Art, Nagoya City Gallery, Japan, 2006
- Vital Signals: Early Japanese Video Art, Electronic Arts Intermix and Japan Society, New York, 2010
- MAM Research 004: Video Hiroba - Reexamining the 1970s Experimental Video Art Group, Mori Art Museum, Tokyo, 2016–17

== Publications ==
Sources:

- Video Guidebook 4 (Tokyo: Shinjusha, 1976) [Japanese, 『ビデオ便利帳』4 共著1976 伸樹社刊]
- The Supervideo, editor and co-author (Tokyo: Shufu no Tomo, 1978)
  - 『ザ・スーパービデオ』監修 共著 1976 主婦の友社刊
- PLAY THE VIDEO, editor and co-author with The Committee for Thinking About the New Video Life (Tokyo: Japan Victor Corporation, 1978)
  - 『PLAY THE VIDEO』監修 共著 小林はくどう、新しいビデオライフを考える会 （株）日本ビクター刊
- Video Guidebook 7, co-author with Nam June Paik, Toshio Matsumoto, and Yamaguchi Katsuhiro (Tokyo: Shinjusha, 1980)
  - 『ビデオ便利帖』7 共著 1980 （株）伸樹社 協同執筆者：ナムジュンパイク、松本俊夫、山口勝弘
- Let's Make a TV Program series, 5 volumes, co-authored with Naonori Kawamura, Tokyo: Librio Publishing, 1984.
  - [シリーズ・『TV番組を作ろう』全集（全5巻）] 共著 1984 リブリオ出版刊 協同執筆者：川村尚敬
- Hakudō Video Jungle, co-authors Katsuhiro Yamaguchi, Susumu Hani, Nobuhiko Ōbayashi, Fujiko Nakaya, Saitō Yoshishige, and Kenji Misawa (Tokyo: Shinjusha, 1990)
  - 『はくどうのビデオジャングル』共著1990 伸樹社刊 共同執筆者：山口勝弘、羽仁進、大林宣彦、中谷芙二子、 斉藤義重、三沢憲司他。
- You, too, are a videomaker, co-author Nobuhiko Ōbayashi (Tokyo: NHK Publishing, 1996)
  - 『あなたも映像作家』共著 1996 NHK出版 監修：小林はくどう 協同執筆者：大林宣彦
- Citizen Video Manifesto, co-author with Hani Susumu and Ōbayashi Nobuhiko (Tokyo: Genkosha, 1996)
  - 『市民ビデオ宣言』監修 共著 1996 玄光社刊 協同執筆者：羽仁進、大林宣彦他。
- The Super Simple Studio in Video, Softscenario separate manual (Tokyo: AI Soft, 2001)
  - 『ビデオde楽々スタジオ』ソフトシナリオ、 別冊マニュアル 単著 2001 AIソフト刊
- "Departure with Utopia Q&A 1981" and "Communication Media Called Video," in Resistance of Fog: Fujiko Nakaya, eds. Junya Yamamine, Miki Fukuda, Chika Goto, Tomoki Sakuta, Yuta Mizuno, Kyoko Yabusaki, and Momoko Usuda (Tokyo: Film Art Inc., 2019), 266-67, 315-19 [bilingual in Japanese and English; 『霧の抵抗 中谷芙二子展』寄稿 2019 フィルムアート社 寄稿者 磯崎新、岡崎乾二郎、かわなかのぶひろ、萩原朔美、藤幡正樹他

== Major Public Collections ==
- Ludwig Forum for International Art, Aachen, Germany
- Museum of Modern Art, New York
- The Getty Research Institute, Los Angeles
- The Hiroshima City Museum of Contemporary Art
- Yokohama Museum of Art
- The Miyagi Museum of Art
- Aichi Prefectural Art Center
- Tokushima Modern Art Museum
