= Hakudo =

Hakudo may refer to:

- Hakudō Kobayashi (born 1944), Japanese artist working in video and sculpture
- Nakayama Hakudō (1872–1958), Japanese martial artist

== See also ==
- 博道 (disambiguation)
