= 9 Evenings: Theatre and Engineering =

Promotional poster of John Cage’s Variations VII performed at 9 Evenings

9 Evenings: Theatre and Engineering was a series of performances from October 13–23, 1966, where artists and engineers from Bell Laboratories in Murray Hill, New Jersey collaborated on what was to be the first event in a series of projects that would become known as E.A.T. or Experiments in Art and Technology.

== Background ==
9 Evenings: Theatre and Engineering was conjured up by Robert Rauschenberg and Billy Klüver and was originally intended to be presented as part of the Stockholm Festival of Art and Technology in 1966. But when the festival's negotiations fell through, Billy Klüver and the whole group moved the event to the 69th Regiment Armory and called it 9 Evenings: Theatre and Engineering. The participants consisted of 10 artists and some 30 engineers to create a blend of avant-garde theatre, dance and new technologies. 9 Evenings was the first large-scale collaboration between artists and engineers and scientists. The two groups worked together for 10 months to develop technical equipment and systems that were used as an integral part of the artists’ performances. Their collaboration produced many "firsts" in the use of new technology for the theater, both with specially designed systems and equipment and with innovative use of existing equipment. Closed-circuit television and television projection was used on stage for the first time; a fiber-optics camera picked up objects in a performer's pocket; an infrared television camera captured action in total darkness; a Doppler sonar device translated movement into sound; and portable wireless FM transmitters and amplifiers transmitted speech and body sounds to Armory loudspeakers.

== Participants ==
Artists involved with 9 Evenings include: John Cage, Lucinda Childs, Öyvind Fahlström, Alex Hay, Deborah Hay, Steve Paxton, Yvonne Rainer, Robert Rauschenberg, David Tudor, and Robert Whitman. Cage's Variations VII, the next to last in his series of indeterminate works that Cage had begun in 1958 which made increasing use of electronic equipment and systems, was performed at 9 Evenings.

Notable engineers involved include: Bela Julesz, Billy Klüver, Max Mathews, John Pierce, Manfred Schroeder, and Fred Waldhauer.

== Documentation ==
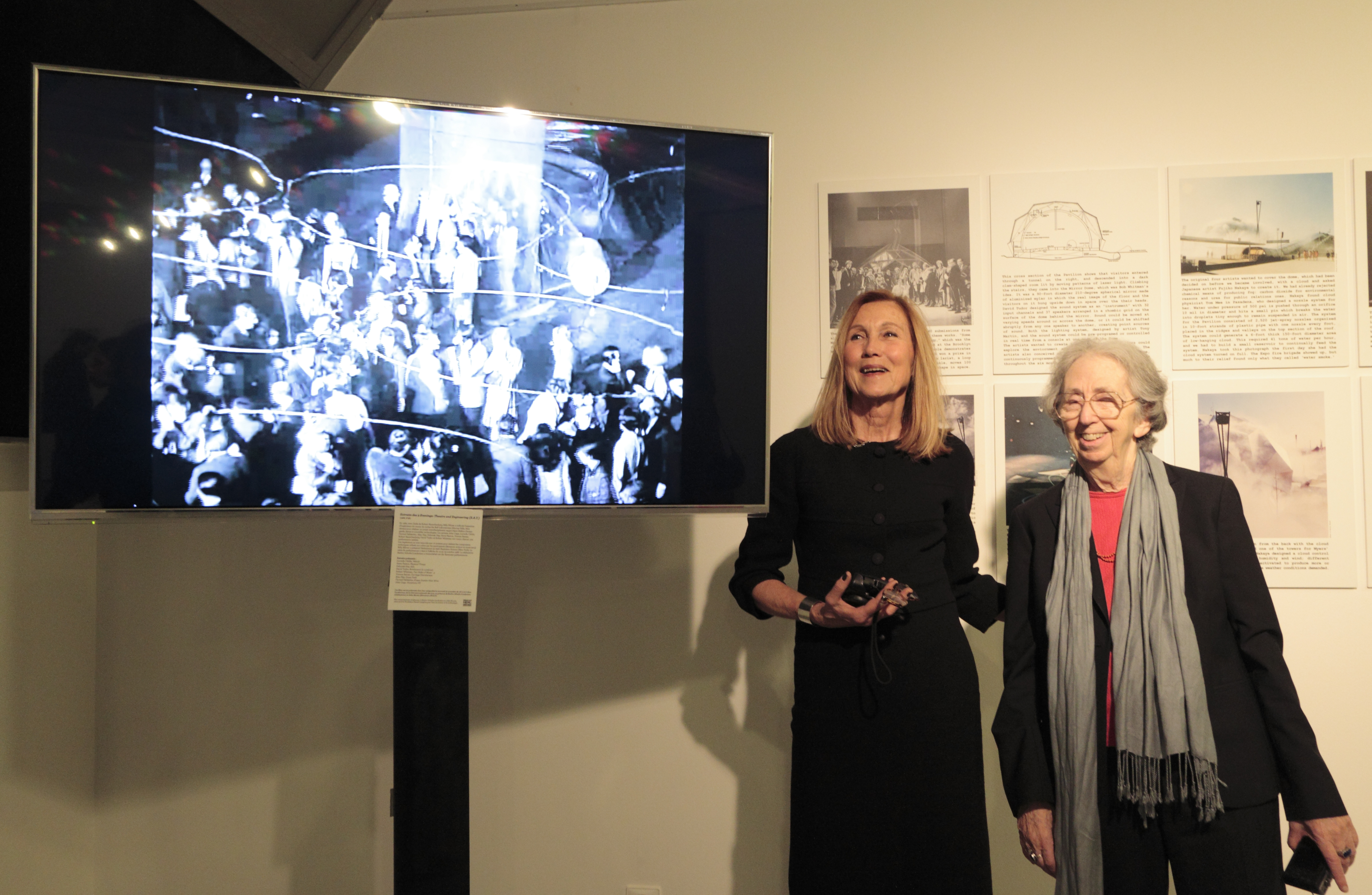
Barbro Schultz Lundestam and Julie Martin in front of the documentation of E.A.T. Experiments in Art and Technology. 9 Evenings: Theatre and Engineering, at Variation Art Jaws media art fair in Paris, November 2017.

The 9 Evenings: Theatre and Engineering DVD Series (director: Barbro Schultz Lundestam) is an important documentation of the collaborations between the artists and engineers that produced innovative works using these emerging technologies. The Swedish journalist and movie/documentary director Barbro Schultz Lundestam visited Billy Klüver and his wife, Julie Martin, in New Jersey in 1993. The couple showed her their archives of the E.A.T. projects, including manuscripts, photographs and 16mm film recordings on 9 Evenings. (Julie Martin and Billy Klüver had met during rehearsals for 9 Evenings, since she was an assistant to Robert Whitman for his performance.) Robert Rauschenberg asked Schultz Lundestam to work on the old film material. She completed 10 documentaries.

Performance Name	Artist
Variations VII	John Cage
Vehicle	Lucinda Childs
Kisses Sweeter Than Wine	Öyvind Fahlström
Grass Field	Alex Hay
Solo	Deborah Hay
Physical Things	Steve Paxton
Carriage Discreteness	Yvonne Rainer
Open Score	Robert Rauschenberg
Bandoneon! (A Combine)	David Tudor (performance engineer Fred Waldhauer)
Two Holes of Water - 3	Robert Whitman
