= Misato Kurimune =

- 栗棟 美里
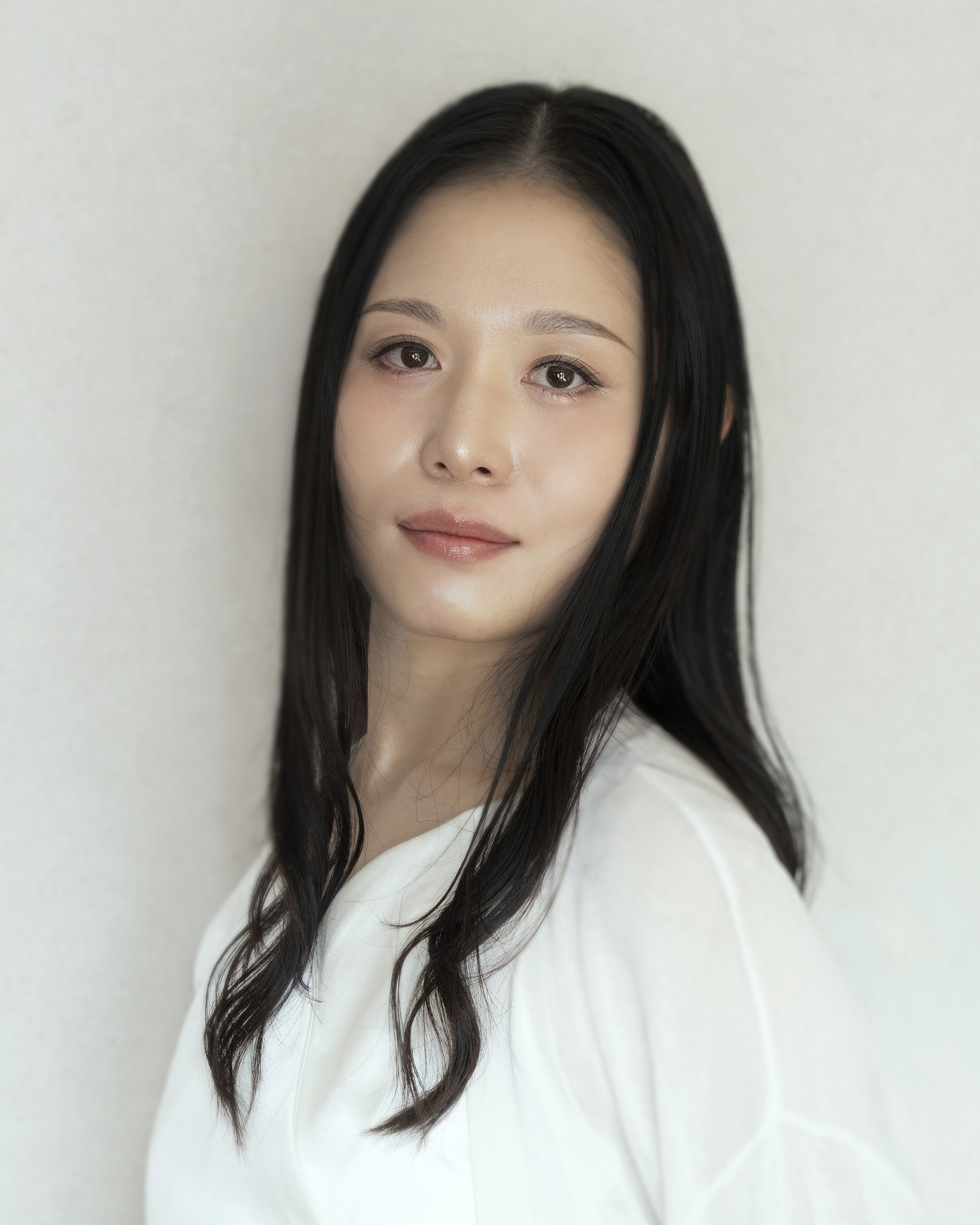
- Portrait photograph of Japanese contemporary artist Misato Kurimune.
- Born: 1988 (age 37–38); Kobe, Hyogo Prefecture, Japan
- Education: Kyoto Seika University (BA 2011, MA 2013)
- Known for: Contemporary art, mixed media, lenticular photography, AI-based imagery
- Notable work: Images series, Display series
- Movement: Contemporary art
- Awards: Sankei Shimbun Prize, Kyoto Art for Tomorrow 2021
- Website: www.misatokurimune.com

Misato Kurimune (born 1988) is a Japanese contemporary artist based in Hyōgo Prefecture. Her practice began with mixed-media works applied over her own photographic prints and has expanded to include lenticular and UV printing and images generated by artificial intelligence, addressing the ambiguity of visual information and the relationship between perception and reality. She received the Sankei Shimbun Prize at Kyoto Art for Tomorrow 2021.

== Early life and education ==
Kurimune was born in 1988 in Kobe, Hyōgo Prefecture. She studied printmaking at Kyoto Seika University, graduating from the printmaking course of the Department of Media Arts, Faculty of Art, in 2011, and completing a Master's programme in printmaking at the university's Graduate School of Arts in 2013.

While a student she was awarded a Museum Acquisition Prize at the 35th National University Print Exhibition (2010) and again at the 36th edition (2011); both prize-winning works were acquired by the Machida City Museum of Graphic Arts.

== Career ==
Kurimune held her first solo exhibition, "Complex / Crushed / Condolence", at Tezukayama Gallery in Osaka in 2013; the same year she was profiled by her home prefecture's newspaper, Kobe Shimbun. Between 2014 and 2017 she presented further solo exhibitions in Osaka, Kyoto, Hyogo and Kobe, including "Flash ⇆ Infinity" at eN arts in Kyoto (2015) and "From Subcutaneous Radicalism to a Return to Reason" (皮下の過激から理性への回帰) at Tezukayama Gallery (2016).

In 2016 she was interviewed by the Japanese print magazine Hanga Geijutsu (Print Art) for a feature on digital printmaking. Her 2018 solo exhibition "Still Remained" at Tezukayama Gallery presented more than sixty works, including her first video piece, Memorise; it was reviewed in The Japan Times.

In 2021 Kurimune participated in the group exhibition "Kyoto Art for Tomorrow 2021 – Kyoto Prefecture Young Artists Exhibition" at Kyoto Bunpaku (The Museum of Kyoto), where her work You may be in this world. Or you may not be. received the Sankei Shimbun Prize. A solo exhibition of the same title was held at Tezukayama Gallery later that year.

In 2024 Kurimune took part in the group exhibition "Interactions", curated by the photographer Tomoko Sawada at Laugh & Peace Art Gallery in Osaka, alongside Sawada and Ayano Sudo; she was interviewed for the exhibition by FANY Magazine. In 2025 she was included in "Kansai Art Annual 2025 'CO'" at Shinsaibashi PARCO in Osaka and in the group exhibition "間 ま MA" at Aki Gallery in Taipei, presenting lenticular works whose imagery shifts with the viewer's angle.

In 2026 Kurimune held the solo exhibition "What are we really looking at?" at Tezukayama Gallery, her first solo show at the gallery in about five years; it was reviewed by Bijutsu Techo and covered by ART iT.

== Work ==
Kurimune's early works used monochrome photographs she had taken herself, printed onto fabric and other supports, over which she applied materials such as foundation makeup and silver leaf in a mixed-media approach. Her stated concerns are the notions of beauty, existence, time and life; these themes have remained central across her career.

In the Lost Idea series, she photographed magazine photo spreads placed beneath broken glass, exploring how meaning is fragmented and reconstituted as digital media and social networks reshape the role of print media.

Since 2020 Kurimune has developed the Images series, in which lenticular lenses produce angle-dependent visual effects. The portraits in the series are composited from photographs Kurimune has taken herself together with images drawn from the internet, so that the resulting figures do not depict identifiable persons; the series addresses the credibility of data and portraiture in a society mediated by online communication.

Her Display series, first exhibited in 2024, reproduces droplets rendered in AI-generated images through volumetric UV printing, so that a two-dimensional dataset acquires a three-dimensional presence.

== Teaching ==
Kurimune formerly served as a part-time lecturer in the printmaking major of the Faculty of Art at Kyoto Seika University.

== Awards ==
- 2010 – Museum Acquisition Prize, 35th National University Print Exhibition
- 2010 – Special Jury Prize, Maebashi Art Compe Live 2010
- 2010 – Mayor's Prize (printmaking), Kyoten (Kyoto City Municipal Exhibition)
- 2011 – Museum Acquisition Prize, 36th National University Print Exhibition
- 2021 – Sankei Shimbun Prize, Kyoto Art for Tomorrow 2021, for You may be in this world. Or you may not be.

== Collections ==
Kurimune's prize-winning works from the 35th and 36th National University Print Exhibitions are held in the collection of the Machida City Museum of Graphic Arts.

== Publications ==
- Kurimune, Misato (2024). Images. SunM Color. – Artist book compiling the lenticular Images series.

== Selected exhibitions ==
=== Solo exhibitions ===
- 2013 – Complex / Crushed / Condolence, Tezukayama Gallery, Osaka
- 2014 – Complex Wedding, Hotel Granvia Osaka, Osaka
- 2015 – Flash ⇆ Infinity, eN arts, Kyoto
- 2016 – From Subcutaneous Radicalism to a Return to Reason (皮下の過激から理性への回帰), Tezukayama Gallery, Osaka
- 2017 – Crushed/copy, Osteria Regalo, Kobe
- 2018 – Still Remained, Tezukayama Gallery, Osaka
- 2021 – You may be in this world. Or you may not be. (あなたはこの世界にいるかもしれない。もしくはいないかもしれない。), Tezukayama Gallery, Osaka
- 2022 – Images/Muse, LOP, Wakayama
- 2023 – The Wheel of existence, CONCEPT STORE SEE?, Kobe
- 2026 – What are we really looking at?, Tezukayama Gallery, Osaka

=== Group exhibitions and art fairs (selection) ===
- 2011 – ART TORONTO, Metro Toronto Convention Centre, Canada
- 2013 – YOUNG ART TAIPEI 2013, Sheraton Grande Taipei, Taiwan
- 2013 – ART TORONTO, Metro Toronto Convention Centre, Canada
- 2015 – FOTOFEVER, Carrousel du Louvre, Paris
- 2018 – RE: FOCUS vol.3, Tezukayama Gallery, Osaka
- 2019 – ONE ART Taipei, Taipei, Taiwan
- 2021 – Kyoto Art for Tomorrow 2021 – Kyoto Prefecture Young Artists Exhibition, The Museum of Kyoto
- 2024 – Interactions (curated by Tomoko Sawada), Laugh & Peace Art Gallery, Osaka
- 2025 – Kansai Art Annual 2025 'CO', Shinsaibashi PARCO, Osaka
- 2025 – 間 ま MA, Aki Gallery, Taipei
- 2025 – RITUALS – International Group Exhibition, Millepiani, Rome
