= Tomoko Sawada =

Japanese photographer (born 1977)

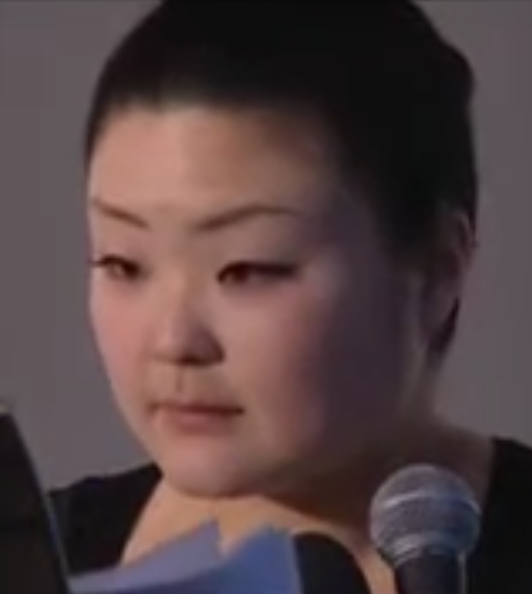
- At the Brooklyn Museum in 2007
- Born: 1977 (age 48–49); Kobe, Japan
- Education: Seian University of Art and Design

Tomoko Sawada (澤田 知子, Sawada Tomoko; born 1977 in Kobe, Japan) is a Japanese contemporary feminist photographer and performance artist. She has been included in numerous group shows in Japan, Europe and the US. Her first solo exhibition was in 1997 at Japan's Gallery Chat. In 2004 she was awarded the prestigious Kimura Ihei Memorial Photography Award for Young Japanese Photographer as well as the International Center of Photography Infinity Award in the category of Young Photographer.

== Life and work ==
Sawada graduated in 1998 with a degree in Media Design, then later in 2000 with a degree in Photography from the Seian University of Art and Design in Otsu, Shiga, Japan. Some of her works of art include ID-400, OMIAI♡, Costume, Schoolgirls, Costume, Cover, Masquerade, Recruit, Mirrors, and Facial Signature. Her work investigates human identity and especially gender roles and stereotypes in Japanese culture.

Sawada uses photography and techniques of performance art to explore ideas of identity, status, culture, individualism, and conformity through traditional and contemporary cultural methods of portraiture. Sawada's photographs are each part of a themed photo series in which she makes use of make-up and costume to dramatically alter her identity, such that each photograph appears to represent a different individual or group of individuals, when all subjects are Sawada herself. Sawada uses commercial photographers, photo booths, and her own studio environment with digital photo editing to represent hundreds of different identities. Tomoko's use of costume in her self-portraits draws inspiration from the work of Cindy Sherman. Her work also explores the way assumptions about personality are largely driven by Japanese cultural responses to gender, job occupation, and other socio-cultural stereotypes.

== Career ==
Sawada's earliest self-portrait photo series is Early Days from 1995 to 1996 made while Sawada was in her teens. Her next series, ID400, was created over the course of 4 years, from 1998 to 2001 using a public photo booth to take 400 different ID card style self-portraits while Sawada altered her appearance through costume, hair, and make-up changes along with altering her facial expression or even gaining/losing weight. Subsequent photo series continue to explore varying methods of altering Sawada's outward appearance then documenting these changes using single and group style photographic methods.

Sawada was artist in residence of the International Studio & Curatorial Program in New York City in 2006 and 2008, and at the The Andy Warhol Museum in 2012. In 2025, she was an artist in residence in Paris.

=== Early Days, 1995–1996 ===
Sawada's earliest photo series.

=== ID400, 1998–2001 ===
For this photo series, Sawada visited the same photo booth outside a train station in Kobe, Japan over the course of four years to create 400 different black and white ID card photos of herself.

=== OMIAI♡, 2001 ===
Sawada's OMIAI♡ series references the traditional photo book of a young woman used by her family members for an arranged marriage. Sawada was photographed in a professional photography studio. On each visit she dressed as a different type of woman, as the photographs are carefully produced with the intention of showing a woman's identity for the prospective young man and his family.

=== Cover/Face, 2002–2003 ===
Photographs in this series show Sawada attired based on trends of the Japanese youth culture and the influence of Western ideas of beauty. She dressed herself as a ganguro, described as a tan, California girl type idolizing the pop music star Namie Amuro.

=== Costume, 2003 ===
Sawada dresses in the uniforms and work clothes associated with various jobs. The idea for this series grew from her personal experiences working in different roles and learning how different people responded to her in these roles, "people's attitude toward another person changes greatly according to their occupation."

=== School Days, 2004 ===
This series shows Sawada repeated within the same large group class portraits as both the students and their teacher wearing a school girl uniform and then dressed as the typical school matron. Sawada finds ways of altering her presentation wearing identical school uniforms through changes to her hair style, accessories, and facial expressions, then the images are digitally combined to create the class, including a background.

== Exhibitions and awards ==
=== Solo exhibitions ===
- 1997, Gallery Chat, Noir, Japan
- 1999, ID400, Clean Sisters Gallery, Osaka
- 1999, ID400, Cubic Gallery Iteza, Kyoto
- 2000, ID400, Rocket, Tokyo
- 2001, Omiai, Rocket, Tokyo
- 2001, Omiai, Sou Art Gallery, Ehime
- 2001, Omiai, The Third Gallery Aya, Osaka
- 2001, Cover, VAJRA, Osaka
- 2001, Connoisseur Contemporary, Hong Kong
- 2002, Cover, SUMISO, Osaka
- 2002, Omiai, Galerie P, Brussels
- 2003, ID400 and Omiai, Kohji Ogura Gallery, Nagoya
- 2003, Two Photographic Series, Zabriskie Gallery, New York
- 2003, Costume, The Third Gallery Aya, Osaka
- 2004, Costume + cover, Konica Minolta Plaza, Tokyo
- 2004, ID400, The Third Gallery Aya, Osaka
- 2004, Costume, Zabriskie Gallery, New York
- 2004, Desire to Mimic, MAK, Vienna
- 2005, Schoolgirls – School Days + cover/Face, MEM, Osaka
- 2006, Schoolgirls, Zabriskie Gallery, New York
- 2011, Rose Gallery, Santa Monica, CA - Reflection
- 2011, Connoisseur Art Gallery, Hong Kong - Masquerade
- 2013, Rose Gallery, Santa Monica, CA - Sign
- 2015, Pace/MacGill Gallery, New York City - My Faces
- 2016, Rose Gallery, Santa Monica, CA - Facial Signature
- 2017, MART Gallery, Dublin - School Days

=== Group shows ===
- Santa Barbara Museum of Art, California
- Japan Society, New York
- Det Nationale Fotomuseum, Copenhagen
- Culturgest, Lisbon
- Z Platz Museum, Fukuoka, Japan
- Musee de l’Elysee, Lausanne
- Japanisches Kulturinstitut, Cologne
- Museum of Contemporary Art, Tokyo
- Museum of Contemporary Photography, Chicago
- Ueno Royal Museum, Tokyo; Kawasaki City Museum
- Museum of Modern Art, New York.

=== Awards ===
- 2000 Canon New Cosmos of Photography 2000
- 2004 The Kimura Ihei Memorial Photography Award
- 2004 International Center of Photography (New York) Infinity Award for Young Photographers
- 2007 The Kyoto Prefecture Culture Prize
- 2008 Higashikawa Prize

=== Permanent collections ===
- Museum of Modern Art, New York
- International Center of Photography, New York
- Los Angeles County Museum of Art
- Fogg Museum of Art, Harvard University, Cambridge
- Joy of Giving Something, Inc., New York
- Norton Family Collection
- MAK, Vienna, Austria
- The Essl Collection, Klosternerberg, Austria
- La Salle Bank, Illinois
- Santa Barbara Museum of Art, California
- National Museum of Modern Art, Kyoto, Japan
- Maison Europeenne de la Photographie, Paris, France
- Sculpture Garden Museum, Vangi Museo, Japan
- Davis Museum and Cultural Centre, USA
- Brooklyn Museum of Art, New York City
- San Francisco Museum of Modern Art
- J. Paul Getty Museum
