= Sylvia Palacios Whitman =

Chilean-American artist and dancer

- Born: August 25, 1941 (age 84); Osorno, Chile
- Education: Santiago's School of Fine Arts
- Known for: Performances
- Notable work: Human Paper Coil (1974), Passing Through (1977), Negatives (1981)
- Spouses: Enrique Castro-Cid; Robert Whitman (m. 1968; died 2024)

Sylvia Palacios Whitman (born August 25, 1941) is a Chilean-American artist, painter, sculptor, and performer.

== Career ==
Whitman was born in Osorno in Chile and studied Painting and Sculpture at the University of Chile, Fine Arts School in Santiago, Chile. In 1961 she arrived in New York, where she pursued her own work in drawing, painting, and modeling. She worked with notable photographers such as Richard Avedon, and his portrait of her appeared on the cover of Harper's Bazaar. Whitman became interested in dance and theater and performed with Trisha Brown and "The Trisha Brown Dance Company" from 1970 to 1973 in New York and across the United States and Europe. Between 1974 and 1984 she staged her performances in notable venues, including the Whitney Museum and Guggenheim Museum in New York, Moderna Museet in Stockholm, and Manhattan galleries such as The Kitchen and the Sonnabend Gallery.

In 1974, Whitman began staging her first pieces. Going, Soup & Tart and Red Cone were performed at various venues in downtown Manhattan, including artists' lofts, The Kitchen, Artist Space, the Sonnabend Gallery and the Whitney Museum. She used surreal stage props and giant drawings to create a visual theater that combined a rich Latin-American pictorial sensibility with the minimalism of the New York scene.

Palacio Whitman's first own art performances took place at Brown's studio in Soho in 1974. Under the encompassing title of Going she presented works that were athletic, with bold physical actions that unfolded to create surprising and powerful images. The performances Dining Room, Self Lifting Forwards, Walking, Dialogue & Stop, Jump up a Pyramid, 3 Radios, Guessing a Person's Movement, The Birds, Change of Volume with Distance, Shoulder Dance, Nine People Square, and Shoes were all included in the program.

In 1975, Whitman presented her show In Moving at Trisha Brown's Studio. Although no one was dancing or acting, the pieces required serious coordination, timing and sensitivity to space in order to perform pieces like Elephant Trunk, Black Rectangle Passing, Curve and Weight, Legs, Cat's Cradle under the name 8 String Pieces, Red Cone, Human Paper Coil, under the name Wearing a Spiral Floor, and Horses. In Cat's Cradle (1975) six women used a loop of rope to enact the titular game, their bodies standing in for fingers as they create various geometric designs. They thus blow a child's pastime up to adult proportions. In Human Paper Coil (1974) a lone female performer wraps herself in a spiral of brown paper that lies in a 10-foot-wide sheet on the floor, then shuffles out of the room, implying a play on the expression shuffling off this mortal coil.

During 1976, Whitman presented Clear View (one place at a time) at The Kitchen in New York. On that occasion she performed along with Jeff Aron, Lynne Morrison and Carol Parkinson an eight piece show, including her new performances: With a Tree, Fans, Outside-Inside, Introducing the Andrade Family, Ironing, Cigar, My Brother Rehearsing for the Funeral of Father Mayer and also Horses.

A group of works titled Passing Through was presented at the Sonnabend Gallery in Soho during 1977. On this occasion Whitman showed: Staircase, Mummies, Volcano, Cloud, Ghost, Airplane, or Passing Through Plane, Floating Stairs, and Family Portrait.

According to the artist, Green Hands began with the idea of extending the body into space. She created two large green flat hands with outstretched fingers that fit over her own hands; as she said, to do this piece she was thinking about "What if the hands didn't stop, but went on and on". In this performance, she wore the hands and slowly moved her arms through the air in a slow sequence of movements and configurations.

In Around the Edge, Whitman presented several performances at the Truck and Warehouse Theatre in March 1978. These performances included Five Cups, Right Time, The House that Follows, Man with Own Shadow, Soft Frame for a Small Black Telephone, Yellow Tube, Bed, Going In (later known as Pulling into Square) and Half Shapes and Shadows. Whitman created South, a visually complex and an exuberant concert at the Guggenheim Museum presented in 1979, based on the artist's past in Chile.

Whitman didn't show anything in New York from the 1980s until 2013, when her works received in-depth recognition. One of the pieces she performed at Broadway 1602 Gallery (14 December 2013 – 15 February 2014) was Elephant Trunk where she also presented works on paper, performance photographs, paintings and live performance with examples dating back to the 1960s. Whitman's films, photographs, original props and notebooks were also presented at the Whitney Museums exhibition Rituals Of Rented Island: Object Theater, Loft Performance, And The New Psychodrama—Manhattan, 1970–1980 (31 October 2013 – 2 February 2014), curated by Jay Sanders. In this context, the artist performed some of her signature pieces Passing Through (1977) and Cup and Tail (1978).

== Influences ==
Whitman's ideas for performances usually come from drawings and sketches of a free spirited imagination. They are intimate mental initiators for scenes later staged. Some drawings advance to giant props that dominate the stage. Whitman continues to make paintings and collages, sharing the surreal sensibility of her performances. Her visual work presents multiples layers of graphite, disruptive structures, disintegrating architecture, and sometimes spiraling movement intersected by photographic fragments, objects, and collage pieces.

Her work has been presented at the Broadway 1602 Gallery, the Museum of Modern Art in Warsaw, the Tate Modern Gallery in London and, the Radical Women: Latin American Art, 1960–85 both in Los Angeles and New York.

== Performances ==
- 1974 Going, Trisha Brown's studio at 541 Broadway, New York City. Included: Table and chairs, Human Paper Coil, Elephant Trunk, and Jumping up the Pyramid.
- 1975 In Moving, Trsha Brown's studio, New York City. Included: Cat's Cradle and Red Cone.
- 1975 Performance Evening, Idea Warehouse, New York. Included: Green Bag, and Slingshot.
- 1975 Metroline, at University of Colorado, Denver.
- 1976 Clear View, at The Kitchen, New York.
- 1977 Passing Through, at Sonnabend Gallery, Soho, New York. Included: "Green Hands" and "Cup and Tail", Cloud, Floating stairs, and Family Photos.
- 1978 On Edge, at Truck and Warehouse Theater, New York.
- 1979 Performance Evening, at Buecker & Harpsichords, New York.
- 1980 South, at Guggenheim Museum, New York.
- 1980 Lee Towney, NY, at American Theatre Laboratory, New York.
- 1981 Negatives, at Moderna Museet, Stockholm, Sweden.

== Exhibitions with performances ==
- 2013 Rituals Of Rented Island: Object Theater, Loft Performance, And The New Psychodrama Manhattan, 1970–1980. Group Exhibition at the Whitney Museum of American Art, 31 October 2013 – 2 February 2014.
- Evening of performances: 18 January 2014. Included: Human Paper Coil, Negatives, Mummies, Cat's Cradle, Elephant Trunk, Green Hands, and Cup and Tail.
- 2013 Sylvia Palacios Whitman solo exhibition at Broadway 1602, 13 December 2013 – 15 February 2014.
- Evening of performances: 13 December 2013. Included Human Paper Coil, Negatives, Mummies, Cat's Cradle, and Elephant Trunk.
- 2016 Inaugural Exhibition, Group Exhibition at Broadway 1602 Uptown, 2 March – 23 April 2016.
- 2016 121 Street, Group exhibition at Broadway 1602 Harlem, 6 May – 5 August 2016
- 2016 Around The Edge, Group exhibition, Broadway 1602 Uptown, 12 July – 19 August 2016.
- 2017 The Beguiling Siren Is Thy Crest, Group Exhibition at Museum of Modern Art in Warsaw, 25 March – 18 June 2017. Performance video projected on exterior of the new building.
- 2017 Radical Women: Latin American Art, 1960–85 at Hammer Museum, Los Angeles, 15 September – 31 December 2017.
- Performance evening at Red Cat for January 2018.
- 2018 Sylvia Palacios Whitman, Redcat, Los Angeles, 11 and 13 January 2018. Presented in Partnership with Hammer Museum and Show Box L.A/we live in space as part of Pacific Standard Time Festival: Live Art LA/LA
- 2018 Sylvia Palacios Whitman: Around the Edge, Tate Modern, BMW Tate Live Exhibition, 23 March 24, 2018.
- 2018 Radical Women: Latin American Art, 1960– 85 at Brooklyn Museum, New York, 13 April – 22 July 2018.
- Evening of Performances: 14 April 2018. Included: Human Paper Coil, Cup and Tail, Cat's Cradle, Mummies, Negatives, The House that Follows, Green Hands, and Elephant Trunk.
