= Hiromichi =

- Gender: Male

Origin
- Origin: Japanese
- Meaning: Different meanings depending on the kanji used

Hiromichi (written: 煕通, 博通, 宏典, 弘道, 広道, 浩道, 寛道, 寛理 or 博達) is a masculine Japanese given name. Notable people with the name include:

- Hiromichi Fuyuki (冬木 弘道; 1960–2003), Japanese wrestler
- Hagiwara Hiromichi (萩原 広道; 1815–1863), Japanese scholar, philosopher, writer and poet
- Hiromichi Ishige (石毛 宏典; born 1956), Japanese baseball player
- Hiromichi Kageyama (蔭山 弘道; born 1967), Japanese volleyball player
- Hiromichi Katano (片野 寛理; born 1982), Japanese footballer
- Hiromichi Kataura (片浦 弘道; born 1959), Japanese scientist
- Hiromichi Kono (河野 広道; 1905–1963), Japanese entomologist and anthropologist
- Kumazawa Hiromichi (熊沢 寛道; 1889–1966), Japanese businessman
- Hiromichi Kunikawa (國川 浩道; born 1981), Japanese motorcycle racer
- Hiromichi Mizuno (水野 弘道), Japanese financial executive
- Hiromichi Mogaki (茂垣 弘道), Japanese animation producer
- Hiromichi Mori (森 博達; born 1949), Japanese linguist
- Hiromichi Shinohara (篠原 弘道; 1913–1939), Japanese World War II flying ace
- Takatsukasa Hiromichi (鷹司 煕通; 1855–1918), Japanese noble
- Hiromichi Tezuka (手塚 ヒロミチ), Japanese voice actor
- Hiromichi Tanaka (田中 弘道; born 1962), Japanese video game designer, director and producer
- Hiromichi Watanabe (渡辺 博道; born 1950), Japanese politician
- Hiromichi Yahara (八原 博通; 1902–1981), Japanese Imperial Army officer

== Surname ==
- Jun Hiromichi (廣道 純; born 1973), Japanese Paralympic athlete
