= Barbro Östlihn =

Swedish artist

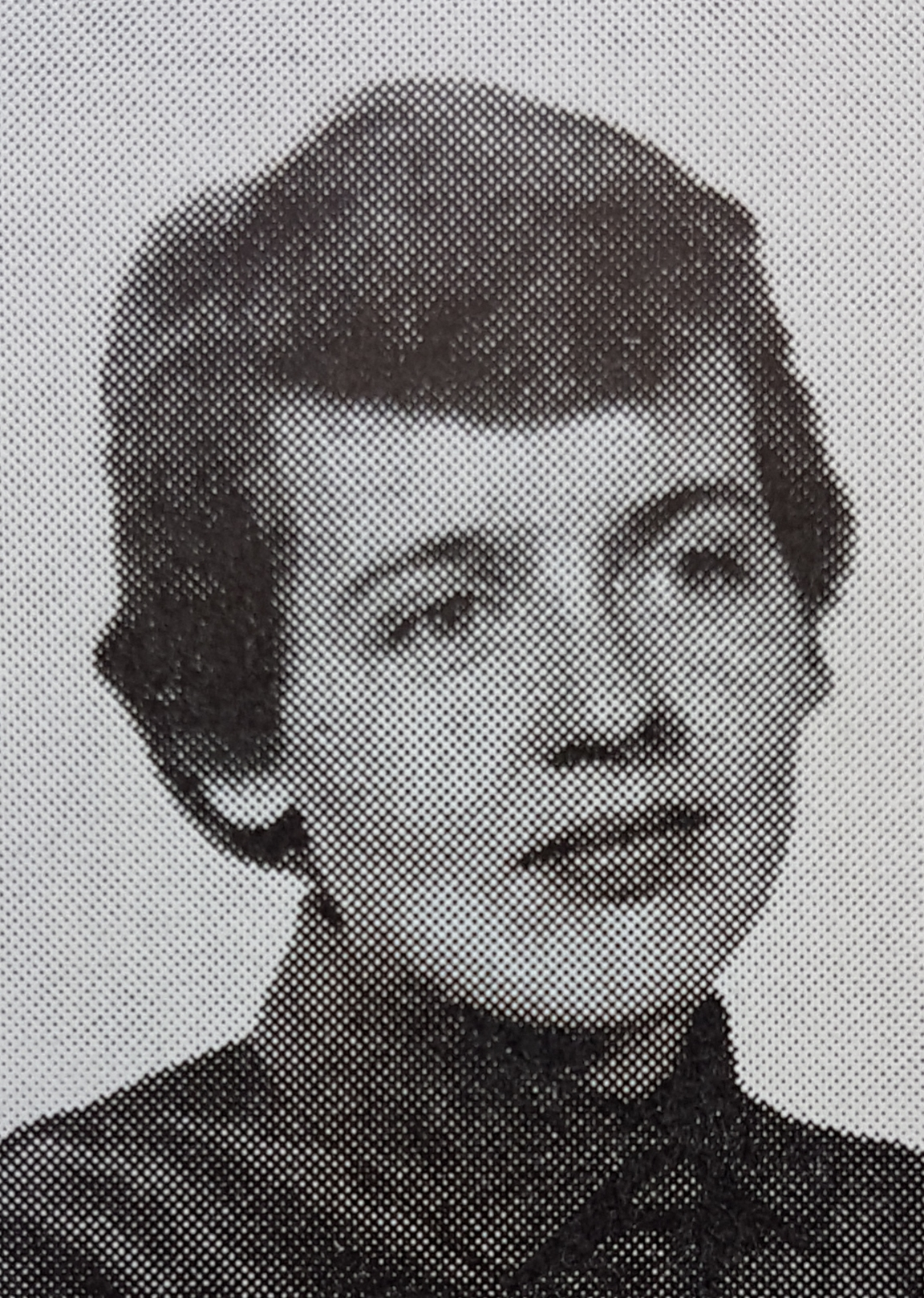
Barbro Östlihn

Barbro Östlihn (May 20, 1930 – January 27, 1995) was a Swedish artist.

== Biography ==
Östlihn specialized in large-scale, geometrically patterned paintings. Many of her hard-edge canvases were abstracted from architectural details—doors, portals, moldings, roofs, skyscrapers—while others were modeled on natural objects such as flowers. Her cool aesthetic approach marked her rejection of the tenets of Abstract Expressionism and put her squarely within the burgeoning Pop art movement. Yet many early critics described her paintings as abstract and precisionist, tinged with the mysterious qualities of surrealism and the decadent nature of Art Nouveau—anything but Pop. One critic classified her as a mere "in-law of the movement," owing to her marriage in 1960 to the Pop artist Öyvind Fahlström. Östlihn supported her husband's career by producing many of Fahlström's paintings and participating in his Happenings while building her own reputation and critical success. After moving to New York City from Stockholm in 1961, she exhibited her work throughout the 1960s at Cordier & Ekstrom (1964) and Tibor de Nagy Gallery (1966, 1968). Östlihn was also one of the only women to be included in the landmark Pop Art exhibition at London's Hayward Gallery in 1969. Several of her works are now in the collection of the Moderna Museet in Stockholm, among many other public and private collections. She moved that same year to Paris where she remained until her death in 1995. She was buried with her family at Norra begravningsplatsen

== Bibliography ==
- Sid Sachs and Kalliopi Minioudaki, Seductive Subversion: Women Pop Artists, 1958–1968. Philadelphia, PA: University of the Arts, Philadelphia, 2010.
- Annika Öhrner, Barbro Östlihn: Liv och Konst/Barbro Östlihn: Life and Art. Norrköping, Sweden: Norrköpings Konstmuseum, 2003.
- "Oyvind Falhstrom Dead of Cancer in Stockholm; Artist and Satirist was 48," New York Times, November 12, 1976, p. 87.
- Hilton Kramer, "Nowadays It's Terribly Hard to Be Scandalous," New York Times, July 27, 1969, p. D19.
- John Russell and Suzi Gablik. Pop Art Redefined. New York: Frederick A. Praeger, 1969.
- S.B. "Barbro Ostlihn" ARTnews v. 66 (February 1968), p. 15.
- T.B. "Barbro Ostlihn" ARTnews v. 64 (February 1966), p. 13.
- Hilton Kramer, "Barbro Ostlihn" New York Times, February 5, 1966, p. 24.
- D. Ashton, Studio v. 167 (February 1964), pp. 82–3.
- Donald Judd, "Barbro Ostlihn" Arts Magazine v. 38 (January 1964), p. 35.
