= Variations VII =

Musical work by John Cage

Variations VII is a piece of contemporary music written by John Cage. It was first performed in 1966, as part of the 9 Evenings concert series in New York. It is largely stochastic, with an indeterminate length and use of unrecorded technological produced or electrically amplified sound. In the words of Cage, the sounds had to "be in the air at the moment of performance". Photocells were used to turn on and off the sound sources.
