= 博道 =

博道, meaning 'wide, way', may refer to:

- Braddell Secondary School, a secondary school in Singapore
- Hakudo, a masculine Japanese given name
- Hiromichi, a masculine Japanese given name
