= Experiments in Art and Technology =

Non-profit organization

Experiments in Art and Technology (E.A.T.), a non-profit and tax-exempt organization, was established in 1967 to develop collaborations between artists and engineers. The group operated by facilitating person-to-person contacts between artists and engineers, rather than defining a formal process for cooperation. E.A.T. initiated and carried out projects that expanded the role of the artist in contemporary society and helped explore the separation of the individual from technological change.

2003 poster for exhibition E.A.T. – The Story of Experiments in Art and Technology at the NTT InterCommunication Center

== History ==
E.A.T. was officially launched in 1967 by the engineers Billy Klüver and Fred Waldhauer and the artists Robert Rauschenberg and Robert Whitman. These people had previously collaborated in 1966 when they together organized 9 Evenings: Theatre and Engineering, a series of performance art presentations that united artists and engineers. Ten New York artists worked with 30 engineers and scientists from the world-renowned Bell Telephone Laboratories to create groundbreaking performances that incorporated new technology. Artists involved with 9 Evenings: Theatre and Engineering include: John Cage, Lucinda Childs, Öyvind Fahlström, Alex Hay, Deborah Hay, Steve Paxton, Yvonne Rainer, Robert Rauschenberg, David Tudor, and Robert Whitman. Notable engineers involved include: Bela Julesz, Billy Klüver, Max Mathews, John Pierce, Manfred Schroeder, and Fred Waldhauer.

Video projection, Wireless sound transmission, and Doppler sonar had never been seen in the art of the 1960s. These art performances still resonate today as forerunners of the close and rapidly evolving relationship between artists and technology. The performances were held in New York City's 69th Regiment Armory, on Lexington Avenue between 25th and 26th Streets as an homage to the original and historical 1913 Armory Show.

The press launch for E.A.T was held on October 10, 1967, at Rauschenberg's Lafayette Street studio. Speeches were delivered by Robert Rauschenberg and others, including John Pierce, Executive Director of Bell Labs. The backdrop to the conference was Leon Harmon and Ken Knowlton's Computer Nude (Studies in Perception), one of the earliest examples of computer art.

The pinnacle of E.A.T. activity is generally considered to be the Pepsi Pavilion at Expo '70 at Osaka, Japan, where E.A.T. artists and engineers collaborated to design and program an immersive dome that included a fog sculpture by Fujiko Nakaya. Organized by E.A.T. founders Billy Klüver and Robert Whitman, the project was led by a core design team that also included Robert Breer, Frosty Myers, David Tudor, and a group of over 75 artists and engineers from the US and Japan. The original structure consisted of a Buckminster Fuller-style geodesic dome covered by a water vapor cloud sculpture, designed by Fujiko Nakaya, to which the architect John Pearce had devised a way to fit a Mylar mirror inside the structure.

The optical effect in the spherical mirror produced real images resembling that of a hologram. Due to the size of the mirror, a spectator looking at an image could walk around it and see it from all sides. On the terrace surrounding the Pepsi Pavilion were seven of Robert Breer's Floats, six-foot high kinetic sculptures that moved around at less than 2 feet per minute, while emitting sounds. When a Float hit an obstacle or was pushed it would reverse direction.

Twenty-eight regional E.A.T. chapters were established throughout the U.S. in the late 1960s to promote collaborations between artists and engineers and expand the artist's role in social developments related to new technologies. In 2002 the University of Washington hosted a reunion to celebrate the history of these regional liaisons and consider the legacy of E.A.T. for artists working with new technologies in the 21st century.

E.A.T. activity has entered the canons of performance art, experimental noise music and theater, bridging the gap from the eras of Dada, Fluxus and the Happenings/Actions of the 1960s, through the current generation of digital artists for whom multimedia and technology are the norm. The lineage from E.A.T. experimentations in the 1960s which led to media-art explorations of the 1990s and beyond, is the same historical pathway that has led to the ArtScience movement of the 2000s—the latter an amalgamation of E.A.T., the environmental/ecology movements, and the expanding ontological impact scientific practice has on society. Most recently, E.A.T. included a collaboration with artist and pioneer Beatie Wolfe for its 50-year anniversary, which involved the artist releasing her album as the world's first live 360˚ augmented reality stream, from the Bell Labs anechoic chamber.

== Documentation ==
In 1972 Billy Klüver, Barbara Rose and Julie Martin edited the book Pavilion, that documented the design and construction of the E.A.T. Pepsi Pavilion for Expo '70 in Osaka, Japan.

In 2001 Billy Klüver produced an exhibition of photo and text panels entitled "The Story of E.A.T.: Experiments in Art and Technology, 1960 – 2001 by Billy Klüver." It was first shown in Rome and then again at Sonnabend Gallery in 2002. The exhibition went to Lafayette College in the spring 2002, then to the Evolution Festival in Leeds, England, and University of Washington, in Seattle. In 2003 it traveled to San Diego State University in San Diego, California, and then to a gallery in Santa Maria, California, run by Ardison Phillips – who was the artist who managed the Pepsi Pavilion in 1970. From April to June 2003 a Japanese version was shown at a large exhibition at the NTT Intercommunication Center (ICC) in Tokyo which also included a number of object/artifacts and documents and E.A.T. posters, as well as works of art that Klüver and E.A.T. were involved in. A similar showing took place in Norrköping Museum of Art, Norrköping, Sweden, in September 2004; and a small version of the panels were presented in 2008 at Stevens Institute of Technology as part of a celebration of Experiments in Art and Technology.

In November 2017, the E.A.T. projects were part of the VARIATION ArtJaws media art fair and exhibition at the Cité internationale des arts in Paris: All the panels and some of the below mentioned documentaries were exhibited.

The 9 Evenings: Theatre and Engineering DVD Series (director: Barbro Schultz Lundestam) is an important documentation of the collaborations between the artists and engineers that produced innovative works using these emerging technologies.

== Communications projects ==
EATEX Directory

Prior to Expo '70, E.A.T. had been working on a project to use information technologies to facilitate communications between artists, engineers, and scientists without the need for a central facilitator. This grew out of their dissatisfaction with the centralized control created by their existing matching program that paired artists up with scientists and engineers through E.A.T.'s offices. The project would eventually be called the EATEX directory after going through a number of different proposed forms in the development process. As art historian and curator Michelle Kuo has traced, these forms included timeshare computer data banks, direct telex networks, notched cards, and a printed directory. Most of these proposals were abandoned due to logistical difficulties, and the final form was a printable directory, but the project demonstrated their interest in facilitating decentralized communications networks through emerging technologies. This interest carried through to subsequent projects in the early 1970s.

Projects Outside Art

On the heels of Expo '70, E.A.T released a call for proposals for "realizable projects in the environment" that considered the "utilization of existing technology and available scientific knowledge, recognition of the scale required to make the project effective under existing social and environmental conditions, ecological effects and organizational methods necessary for execution." Four projects were selected for production, namely City Agriculture, Children and Communication, Esthetic Symposium, and Recreation and Play. While E.A.T. worked on organizing all four events, budget shortfalls and other logistical issues resulted in only one project being realized. This was the Children and Communication project, which involved setting up a telex network for children to communicate between two remote sites, namely Automation House on East 68th Street and the E.A.T. Loft (another workspace at the time) at 9 East 16th Street. Begun on December 18, 1970, the project ran until April 8, 1971, during which time many school groups visited in addition to the general public. The two sites were connected by a number of technologies, including ten telephones, two teleprinters, two fax machines, and two telewriters, each of which facilitated a slightly different form of communication. Children were invited to explore these different means of instantaneous visual and textual interaction freely as the project specifically denied any explicit pedagogical goals. Instead, it served more as a training ground for the sensory environment of the information age.

Utopia Q&A, 1981 (1971)

Utopia Q&A, 1981, also known as Telex Q&A, again drew on telecommunications technologies to create person-to-person networks. In this case, the goal was to create transnational networks that avoided the centralization of mass media and could thereby ostensibly create non-hierarchical relationships that eschewed defining individuals through national identities. The project grew out of an E.A.T. proposal for Katsuhiro Yamaguchi's 1969 exhibition Electromagica '69, but developed into a more extensive project when Pontus Hulten contacted E.A.T. to solicit a proposal for his summer 1971 exhibition Utopias & Visions: 1971–1981 at the Moderna Museet. The structure of the project was to have four nodes around the world—Stockholm, New York, Tokyo, and Ahmedabad—with telex terminals installed from July 30 – August 30, 1971. These would collect and relay messages between public visitors to each site. Two of the sites—Tokyo and Stockholm—were organized as public exhibition spaces, but the New York site was to be run out of Automation House (although flooding required the use of the Waldorf Astoria Hotel) and the Ahmedabad site was located in the National Institute of Design. Visitors to any of the sites could type in questions to ask anyone at any of the other sites—some of whom were experts in science, culture, or media—as well as answer questions from the other nodes. Questions were phrased to imagine what the near future, namely 1981, might hold in store. Examples of submitted questions included:

Q2 from New York: Will minority groups have full political representation in 1981?...

Q32 from Stockholm: Who is going to determine the difference between public and private information in 1981? (In reference to computer banks)…

Q38 from Bombay: Will sound be more meaningful than music? Will all organized arts become out of date?

The Tokyo node of this project is particularly notable as it marked the official founding of E.A.T. Tokyo, a branch of E.A.T. formed by Fujiko Nakaya, Hakudō Kobayashi, and Yūji Morioka for this project. It continued Nakaya's involvement in E.A.T. in a more formal mode, following Expo '70. Due to the difficulties of translation and the time differences, questions and answers were transmitted twice daily, with foreign transmissions translated in the morning and Tokyo submissions collected and translated in the evening. In addition to this translation infrastructure, the Tokyo node was active in soliciting input from specialists, media figures, and other public figures. The Tokyo node of Utopia Q&A, 1981 was thus the most prolific and organized of the nodes. Its location in the Fuji-Xerox Knowledge-In—a commercial showroom inside the busy Ginza Sony Building—in a space designed to reference newsroom aesthetics, the Tokyo space foregrounded the aesthetics of mass media while employing information technology toward more utopian ends.

=== Human Digital Orchestra ===
The Human Digital Orchestra is a contemporary series of collaborations as part of Experiments in Art and Technology that connects Bell Labs scientists and engineers with the artistic community by blending digital communications technology with artistic expression. The first performance of the Human Digital Orchestra was at the first Claude Shannon Centennial Conference on the Future of the Information Age on April 28, 2016.

The Human Digital Orchestra performed for the second time at the Propeller Fest conference in Hoboken, New Jersey, on May 20, 2016, in a collaboration with Beatie Wolfe.

== See also ==
- Intermedia
- Systems art
- Digital art
- Computer art
- Conceptual art
- Systems thinking
- Algorithmic art
- Moon Museum

== Sources ==
- Steve Wilson, Information arts: Intersections of Art, Science, and Technology. MIT Press, ISBN 0-262-73158-4
- Frank Popper, Art of the Electronic Age (1993) Thames and Hudson Ltd., London, and Harry N. Abrams Inc, New York, ISBN 0-8109-1928-1
- Klüver Billy, J. Martin, Barbara Rose (eds), Pavilion: Experiments in Art and Technology. New York: E. P. Dutton, 1972
- John Rockwell, The Man Who Made a Match of Technology and Art. New York Times. (Late Edition (East Coast)). New York, N.Y.:Jan 23, 2004. p. E.3
- Charlie Gere (2005) Art, Time and Technology: Histories of the Disappearing Body, Berg, pp. 134 & 137
- Christiane Paul (2003). Digital Art (World of Art series). London: Thames & Hudson. p. 16
- Nechvatal, Joseph. (2012) Immersion Into Noise. Ann Arbor: Open Humanities Press, 191
