= Jack M. Sipress =

American electrical engineer

Jack M. Sipress (born April 9, 1935) is an American electrical engineer, former employee of Bell Labs, known for his contributions to the development of submarine communications facilities.

== Biography ==
Sipress studied Electrical Engineering at the Polytechnic Institute of New York University, where he received his BS in 1956, his MS in 1957 and his PhD in 1961.

After graduation Sipress joint Bell Labs, where he was supervisor involved in the development of the T-carrier digital transmission systems. During the 1960s he received multiple patents. At Bell Labs from 1976 to 1978 he was involved in the development of satellite systems. In 1978 he turned his attention to fiber-optic communication in submarine applications. Late 1980s he was Director of the Undersea Systems Laboratory and in the 1990s chief technical officer and senior vice president of research.

Sipress received several awards and honors. In 1975 he was elected IEEE Fellow for his "contributions to the development of pulse-code modulation systems." He received the IEEE Communication Society Armstrong Technical Achievement Award in 1988; the C&C Prize in 1991; and the IEEE Simon Ramo Medal in 1994. In 1998 he was elected Member of the National Academy of Engineering (Electronics) for his contributions to "the development and implementation of international communications facilities via undersea lightwave cables."

== Selected publications ==
- Irwin Dorros, Jack M. Sipress, and Fred Waldhauer. "An experimental 224 Mb/s digital repeatered line." Bell System Technical Journal 45.7 (1966): 993-1043.
- Sipress, Jack M. "Undersea communications technology." AT&T technical journal 74.1 (1995): 4-7.
