= Öyvind Fahlström =

Swedish multimedia artist (1928–1976)

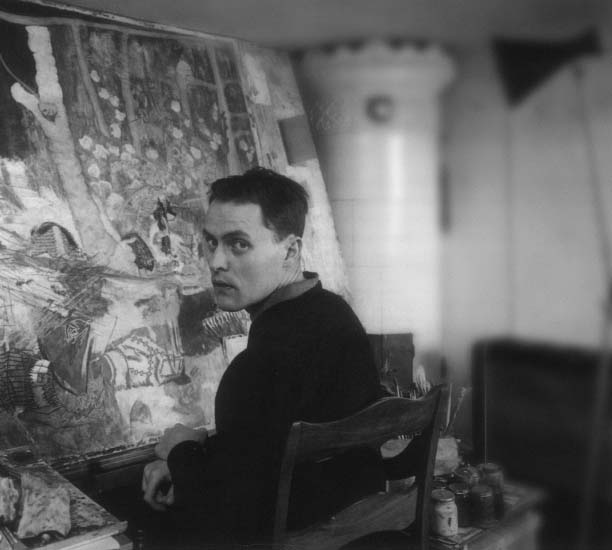
- Öyvind Fahlström
- Born: Öyvind Axel Christian Fahlström; 28 December 1928; São Paulo, Brazil
- Died: 9 November 1976 (aged 47); Stockholm, Sweden
- Movement: Fluxus

Öyvind Axel Christian Fahlström (28 December 1928 – 9 November 1976) was a Brazilian-born Swedish multimedia artist.

== Biography ==
Fahlström was born in São Paulo, Brazil, as the only child to Frithjof and Karin Fahlström. In July 1939, he was sent to Stockholm to visit some distant relatives. Following World War II, he started to study and later on to work as a writer, critic and journalist. From 1960 until 1976 he was married to the Swedish pop artist Barbro Östlihn.

== Career ==
In 1953, Fahlström had his first solo exhibition, showing the drawing Opera, a room-sized felt-pen drawing. In 1953, he wrote Hätila ragulpr på fåtskliaben, a manifesto for concrete poetry, published in Swedish the following year and in English translation (by Mary Ellen Solt, in her anthology "Concrete Poetry. A world view") in 1968.

In 1956, Fahlström moved to Paris and lived there for three years before he moved to Front Street studio, New York City. In New York, he worked with different artists and explored his role as an artist further. In 1962 he participated in the New Realists exhibition at the Sidney Janis Gallery, in New York City. His work was included in the 1964 Venice Biennale and he had a solo exhibition at Cordier & Ekstrom Inc., New York. In 1965 he joined the Sidney Janis Gallery.

In 1966 his work Performance of Kisses Sweeter Than Wine was included in 9 Evenings: Theatre and Engineering, organized by Experiments in Art and Technology at the 26th Street Armory, New York. The same year his painting in oil on photo paper was included in a group exhibition called Erotic Art at the Sidney Janis Gallery. Fahlström had solo exhibitions at the Sidney Janis Gallery in New York City in 1967, 1969, 1973 and 1976. In 1973 he wrote a play called The Black Room, based on the Watergate scandal, and he had a retrospective at Moore College of Art Gallery, in Philadelphia, Pa. During the late 1960s he was among the contributors of a satirical magazine, Puss, in Stockholm.

Fahlström's work is in the collection of the Museum of Modern Art. Although some critics such as Frances Richard dismissed him as a "throwback to Surrealism or Agitprop at worst" other critics, such as Mary Flanagan have seen his use of games as constituting examples of critical play.

== Death ==
Fahlström died of cancer at age 47 in 1976 in Stockholm.

== Sources ==
Kelley, Mike (2003). "Myth Science". In John C. Welchman (ed.). Foul Perfection : essays and criticism. Cambridge, MA: The MIT Press. pp. 158-177. ISBN 978-0-262-11270-3.
