= Hiromichi Mori =

Japanese linguist

Hiromichi Mori (森 博達, Mori Hiromichi; born in 1949) is a Japanese linguist. He makes a study of Chinese phonology and of Old Japanese transcribed into Chinese characters by sound.

== Work ==
He is renowned for a research on the Nihon Shoki. He divides the history book into two groups and claims that Group α (Vol. 14–21, 24–27, 30) was documented by native speakers of the Northern Chinese dialect during the Tang dynasty while Group β (Vol. 1–13, 22–23, 28–29) was written by Japanese. He noticed that Group α is standard written Chinese and applies Chinese characters consistently to Japanese words, but Group β is Japanized Chinese and indiscriminates some characters that were distinguished in Northern Chinese.

He received the 20th Dr Kindaichi Memorial Award (1992) for Chronicles of Ancient Phonology (古代の音韻と日本書紀の成立』に対して).
