= Deborah Hay =

American choreographer (born 1941)

- Born: 1941 (age 84–85); Brooklyn, New York City, U.S.
- Education: Merce Cunningham
- Occupation: Choreographer
- Known for: Performance art, Choreography, Dancing, 9 Evenings: Theatre and Engineering
- Movement: Postmodern dance, Judson Dance Theater, Minimalism. Postmodernism

Deborah Hay (born 1941) is an American choreographer, dancer, dance theorist, and author working in the field of experimental postmodern dance. She is one of the original founders of the Judson Dance Theater. Hay's signature slow and minimal dance style was informed by a trip to Japan while touring with Merce Cunningham's company in 1964. In Japan she encountered Noh (aka nô) theatre and soon incorporated nô's extreme slowness, minimalism and suspension into her post-Cunningham choreography. Sometimes she also imposed stressful conditions on the dancers, as with her "Solo" group dance that was presentation at 9 Evenings: Theatre and Engineering.

== Judson Memorial Church ==
In the 1960s, Hay moved to Downtown Manhattan, where she trained with Merce Cunningham and Mia Slavenska. She became part of the collective of dancers, composers, and visual artists who performed happenings and minimalist dance performances at the Judson Memorial Church and became known as the Judson Dance Theater. Hay regularly collaborated with Steve Paxton, Robert Rauschenberg and her husband Alex Hay on choreographic methods. She and these experimentalists rejected the confines of modern dance practice and theory and helped invent the precepts of postmodern dance within the context of intermedia and minimalism.

== Bell Labs ==
In October 1966, Hay (along with other artists) worked with Bell Labs computer experts in collaborative performances that led to 9 Evenings: Theatre and Engineering. This Bell Lab collaboration also led to the creation of a seminal piece of computer art that involved Hay: Ken Knowlton and Leon Harmon's "Studies in Perception #1". It is an image of Hay, reclining nude, that used typographic symbols for halftone densities to portray her body. This image of Hay was printed in The New York Times on October 11, 1967, and exhibited at one of the earliest computer art exhibitions, The Machine as Seen at the End of the Mechanical Age, held at the Museum of Modern Art in New York City from November 25, 1968, through February 9, 1969.

== 1970s–1980s ==
In 1970, Hay left New York City to live in northern Vermont where she created ten Circle Dances that were performed on ten consecutive nights. No audience was present. In Vermont, Hay began her reflection about her choreographic method: the making of contemporary dance and how such dance ideas can be presented and preserved.

Her first book from 1975, Moving Through the Universe in Bare Feet (Ohio University Press), explains Hay's resulting memory/concept mode of choreographic creation/recording. In it, Hay emphasizes conceptual art narratives underlining the minimal choreographic process of her dance creation.

In 1976, Hay moved from Vermont to Austin, Texas, where she began developing a set of choreographic practices she called playing awake. This choreographic method engaged with the movement of untrained performers. While developing the choreography for these dances, Hay instituted untrained group workshops in Austin and New York City. These workshops culminated in public performances in 1977 and thereafter. From these untrained group workshops, Hay, throughout the 1980s, created choreography for both trained and untrained groups while also making solo dances that used her signature Noh-inspired slow style. In the 1980s, her choreographic style began to take on characteristics of Tai chi-like slow flows.

== 1990s–2000s ==
In 1994, Hay's second book, Lamb at the Altar: The Story of a Dance (Duke University Press), documents the unique creative process that defined these playing awake works.

In the late-1990s, Hay focused on performing solo dances based on her playing awake experimental choreographic method: such as "The Man Who Grew Common in Wisdom", "Voilà", "The Other Side of O", "Fire", "Boom Boom Boom", "Music", "Beauty" and "The Ridge, Room". Hay performed these and other solo dances around the world in the 1990s.

My Body, The Buddhist, her third book, was published by Wesleyan University Press in 2000. It contains her reflections on her interest in Buddhism and the big lessons she learned by paying close attention to her body while it was dancing.

From 1998 through 2012, Hay conducted annual Postmodern dance Solo Performance Commissioning Projects on Whidbey Island in Washington State and at Findhorn Foundation in Findhorn, Scotland. A one-hour documentary film about Solo Performance Commissioning Projects titled Turn Your F*^king Head was made by Becky Edmunds in 2012. It was produced and distributed by Routledge.

In 2000 Hay departed from her usual solo dance-making to create a duet for herself and Mikhail Baryshnikov. This duet toured extensively with the Past/Forward: a series of Postmodern dance and happening performances that updated works of the Judson Dance Theater.

In 2006, Hay choreographed "O, O" for five New York City Postmodern choreographers/dancers. This was followed by her work with seven French professional dancers. In Paris, The Festival d’Automne presented Hay's "The Match" in 2005, "O, O" in 2006, and "If I Sing To You" in 2008, which was commissioned by The Forsythe Company and toured extensively in Europe and Australia. In 2009 The Toronto Dance Theatre premiered her work "Up Until Now". In 2010, Hay created a dance for six Finnish dancers/choreographers called "Lightening", which premiered at the 2010 Helsinki Festival.

== 2010s-present ==
In 2012, Hay created a piece called Blues for "Some sweet day," a dance series at the Museum of Modern Art curated by choreographer Ralph Lemon.

In 2013, her museum installation Perception Unfolds: Looking at Deborah Hay's Dance was curated by Annette Carlozzi for the Blanton Museum of Art at the University of Texas at Austin in Austin Texas. Perception Unfolds: Looking at Deborah Hay's Dance then travelled to the Yale University Art Gallery in New Haven, Connecticut.

In 2015 Hay, in collaboration with Laurie Anderson and lighting designer Minna Tikkainen, created a long work called "Figure a Sea" for twenty one dancers that was commissioned by the Cullberg Ballet in Stockholm, Sweden.

In 2016 Hay presented dances at the University of California, Los Angeles's Center for the Art of Performances' Freud Playhouse. The program included her pieces "As Holy Sites Go" (performed by UCLA faculty members Ros Warby and Jeanine Durning) and "Figure a Sea" (performed by the Cullberg Ballet of Sweden). "Figure a Sea" again featured the music of Laurie Anderson. Both works were revisions of Hay's original piece, "No Time to Fly" that premiered at St. Mark's Church in-the-Bowery in 2010.

In 2016, Hay's fourth book, Using the Sky: a Dance, was published by Routledge Books.

In 2021, Hay established her archive at the Harry Ransom Center in Austin, Texas.
