= Robert Whitman =

American artist (1935–2024)

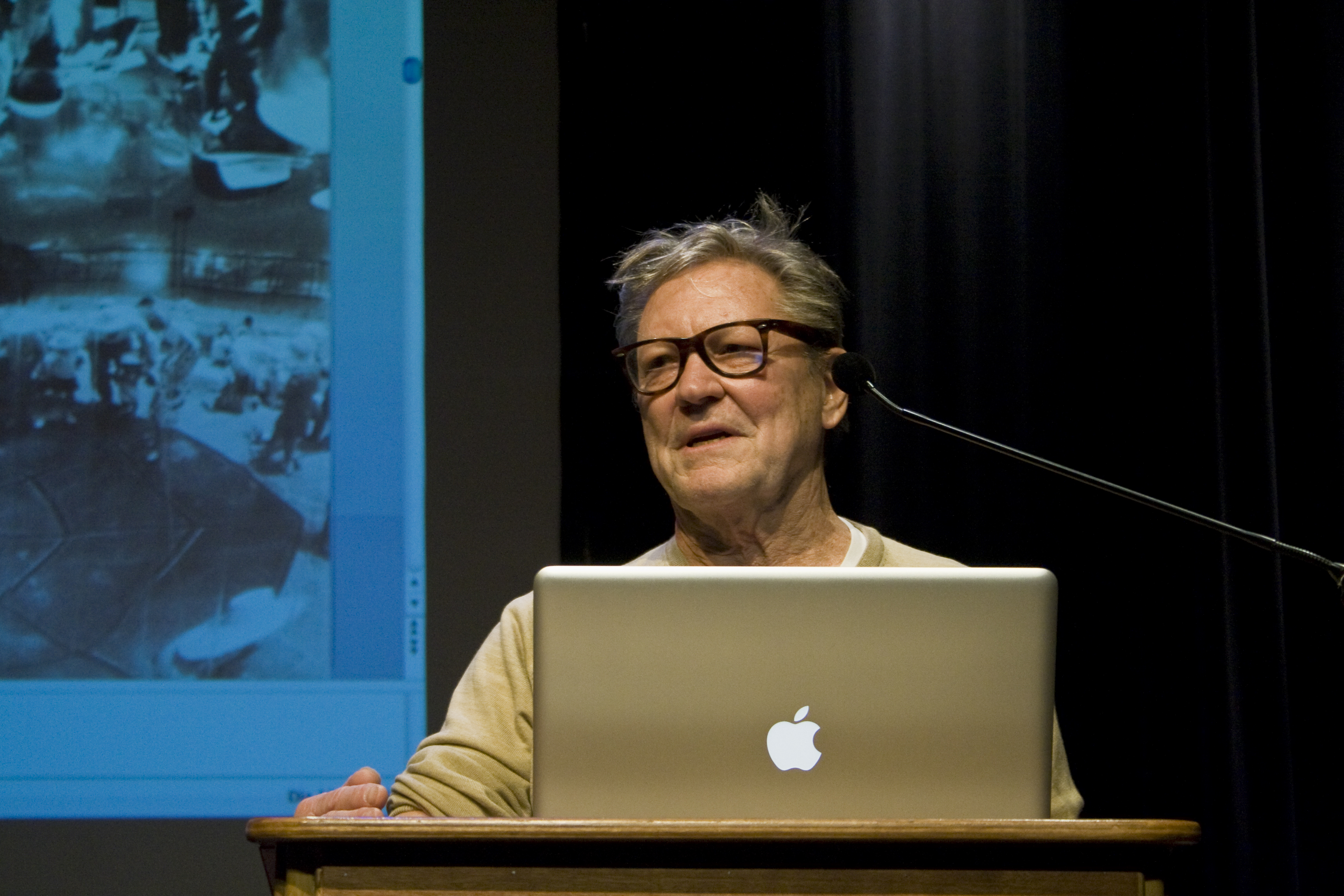
- Whitman in 2010
- Born: May 23, 1935; New York City, U.S.
- Died: January 19, 2024 (aged 88); Warwick, New York, U.S.
- Education: Rutgers University; Columbia University
- Notable work: Experiments in Art and Technology
- Movement: Performance art
- Spouses: Mia Lahanas (m. 1956–1961); Simone Forti (m. 1962–1966); Sylvia Palacios Whitman (m. 1968)
- Children: 3

Robert Whitman (May 23, 1935 – January 19, 2024) was an American artist best known for his seminal theater pieces of the early 1960s combining visual and sound images, actors, film, slides, and evocative props in environments of his own making. From the late 1960s on he worked with new technologies, and his latest work incorporated cellphones.

== Background ==
Whitman was born in Manhattan, New York City, on May 23, 1935, and moved to Englewood, New Jersey, at the age of 10, after his father's death. He attended the local public schools and the Englewood School for Boys (now part of Dwight-Englewood School). Whitman studied literature at Rutgers University from 1953 to 1957 and art history at Columbia University in 1958. He was represented by the Pace Gallery in New York.

Whitman died at his home in Warwick, New York, on January 19, 2024, at the age of 88.

His grandfather was the Metropolitan Museum of Art president Robert W. DeForest.

== Theater works ==
Whitman was a member of the group of visual artists - Allan Kaprow, Red Grooms, Jim Dine, and Claes Oldenburg - who in the early 1960s presented theater pieces on the Lower East Side in Manhattan. Whitman presented more than 40 theater pieces in the United States and abroad, including American Moon, E.G. and Mouth at the Rueben Gallery. Night Time Sky was his contribution to the First New York Theater Rally in New York in 1965; Prune Flat was first presented at the Cinematheque in New York in 1965 and has been performed numerous times since.

In 1966, Whitman was one of the 10 New York artists who worked with Billy Klüver and more than 30 engineers and scientists from Bell Telephone Laboratories to create works that incorporated new technology for 9 Evenings: Theatre and Engineering, a series of performance artworks presented October 13–23 in 1966 at the 69th Regiment Armory in New York City. For this piece, Two Holes of Water- 3, Whitman used seven automobiles on the floor of the Armory, from which were projected film, over-the-air television programs, and closed-circuit television projections of live performances and actions, including images from one of the first fiber-optic miniature video cameras.

A retrospective, Robert Whitman: Theater Works, 1960–1976 was held in 1976 sponsored by the Dia Art Foundation and presented six earlier works and the premiere of Light Touch. His theater works have been presented at the Galerie Maeght Festival in France, Contemporary Arts Museum, Houston, Texas, Moderna Museet, Stockholm; Walker Art Center, Vera List Art Center at MIT, and many more. Ghost, his most recent theater performance, was staged at the Pace Wildenstein Gallery in New York City in 2002.

In 2003 the Dia Art Foundation, in New York presented, Playback, a large-scale retrospective exhibition of Whitman's works. The exhibition traveled to Porto, Portugal, and opened at the Museum of Contemporary Art in Barcelona, Spain in September 2005. A major book, Playback, a comprehensive study of his work, accompanied this exhibition.

In the fall of 2004, Whitman presented a theater performance, Antenna, in Leeds, England, sponsored by Lumens, as part of the New Media Festival there.

== Sculpture and installations ==
Whitman collaborated with engineers on installations and works that incorporate new technology: laser sculptures, including Solid Red Line, in which a red line draws itself around the walls of a room and then erases itself and Pon, a sound-activated metallized PET film mirror installation shown at The Jewish Museum in New York City in 1969.

His long collaboration with optics scientist John Forkner began with a mirror, light, and sound installation for the Art and Technology exhibition at the Los Angeles County Museum of Art in 1971. They developed an optical system that allowed real images to float in space, to appear and disappear in an environment made up of a wall array of 6-inch corner reflectors in which the visitors saw multiple images of themselves.

Whitman was one of the co-founders of Experiments in Art and Technology along with engineers Billy Klüver and Fred Waldhauer and artist Robert Rauschenberg - a project to provide contemporary artists with access to new technology as it developed in research institutions and laboratories. Whitman was one of the core artists for the Pepsi Pavilion at Expo '70, Osaka Japan, a project administered by E.A.T. One of the main features of the interior of the Pavilion was the central performance space in a 90 ft diameter 120 degree spherical mirror made of aluminized reflective PET film, which produced real images of the visitors hanging upside down in space.

Significant one-person exhibitions of Whitman's sculpture and installation pieces include shows at The Museum of Modern Art in New York, The Hudson River Museum of Contemporary Art, Chicago, and Thielska Galleriet, Stockholm. Whitman enjoyed one person gallery exhibitions at PaceWildenstein in New York, and his work has been included in many group exhibitions.

== Telecommunications projects ==
Whitman, working with Experiments in Art and Technology, E.A.T., in the early 1970s, developed and participated in a number of innovative communications projects : - Anand Project: he was part of an interdisciplinary team to develop methods for instructional television programming for rural Indian villages; - Children and Communications, open environments for children to work with a variety of communication equipment; - Telex: Q&A: a worldwide person-to-person question and answer opportunity using telex equipment in New York, Stockholm, Ahmedabad, India, and Tokyo; - Artists and Television, artists’ programming on New York cable channels.

In 1972, Whitman produced his first telephone piece, NEWS, in which participants, using pay phones, called in reports which were broadcast live over radio station WBAI. NEWS was performed later in Houston, Minneapolis, and other cities over a two- or three-year period.

A later performance in Leeds, England in 2002, utilized cell phones, and the calls were broadcast in real time on large speakers in a public square in the town. A recording of the performance was made available by the sponsor, Lumens, at Ubuweb.

In the summer of 2005, Whitman presented Local Report, a video cell phone project.

== Awards ==
Whitman received many awards, including a Guggenheim Fellowship (1976); Creative Artists Public Service Grant; Citation of Fine Arts, Brandeis University; and a Creative Arts Award Xerox Company Grant.

== See also ==
- Happenings
- Expanded Cinema
- Fluxus at Rutgers University
- Experiments in Art and Technology
