= Billy Klüver =

American engineer

- Born: November 11, 1927; Monaco
- Died: January 10, 2004 (aged 76); New Jersey, U.S.
- Education: KTH Royal Institute of Technology
- Engineering career
- Discipline: Electrical engineering

Johan Wilhelm Klüver (November 11, 1927 – January 10, 2004) was an American electrical engineer at Bell Telephone Laboratories who founded Experiments in Art and Technology. Klüver lectured extensively on art and technology and social issues to be addressed by the technical community. He published numerous articles on these subjects. Klüver curated (or was curatorial adviser) for fourteen major museum exhibitions in the United States and Europe. He received the prestigious Ordre des Arts et des Lettres award from the French government.

== Life ==
Dr. Klüver was born in Monaco, November 13, 1927, and grew up in Sweden. He graduated from the Royal Institute of Technology, Stockholm, in Electrical Engineering. In 1952, at age 25, working for a large electronics company in France, Klüver helped install a television antenna on top of the Eiffel Tower and devised an underwater TV camera for Jacques Cousteau's expeditions.

In 1954 he came to the United States and received a Ph.D. in Electrical Engineering from the University of California, Berkeley in 1957. He served as Assistant Professor of Electrical Engineering, at the University of California, Berkeley, 1957–58 and from 1958 to 1968 he was a Member of Technical Staff at Bell Telephone Laboratories in Murray Hill. He published numerous technical and scientific papers on, among others, small signal power conservation in electron beams, backward-wave magnetron amplifiers and infra-red lasers. He held 10 patents.

=== Art and technology practice ===
In the early 1960s, Klüver began to collaborate with artists on works of art incorporating new technology, the first being kinetic art sculptor Jean Tinguely on his Homage to New York (1960), a machine that destroyed itself that was presented in the garden at MOMA. He was introduced to Jean Tinguely by Pontus Hulten, then director of the Moderna Museet in Stockholm. Robert Rauschenberg also assisted on Homage to New York.

Klüver then worked on Robert Rauschenberg’s environmental sound sculpture called Oracle; and later with Yvonne Rainer on her dance in House of My Body. Klüver also worked with John Cage and Merce Cunningham on their Variations V, with Jasper Johns on his Field Painting (1964), and with Andy Warhol on Silver Clouds.

Klüver, Fred Waldhauer and artists Robert Rauschenberg and Robert Whitman collaborated in 1966 organized 9 Evenings: Theatre and Engineering, a series of performances that united artists and engineers. The performances were held in New York City's 69th Regiment Armory, on Lexington Avenue between 25th and 26th Streets as an homage to the original and historical 1913 Armory Show. Ten artists worked with more than 30 engineers to produce art performances incorporating new technology. Early video projection was used in works of Alex Hay, Robert Rauschenberg, David Tudor and Robert Whitman.

In 1967 he wrote a key theoretical text in the history of art and technology: Theater and Engineering - an Experiment: Notes by an Engineer.

=== Experiments in Art and Technology (E.A.T.) ===
In 1967 Klüver, Robert Rauschenberg, Robert Whitman, and Fred Waldhauer founded Experiments in Art and Technology, a not-for-profit service organization for artists and engineers. Since 1968 he served as president of E.A.T.

E.A.T. established a Technical Services Program to provide artists with technical information and assistance by matching them with engineers and scientists who can collaborate with them. In addition. E.A.T. initiates and administers interdisciplinary projects involving artists with new technology. These projects included:

- The Pepsi Pavilion at Expo '70, Osaka Japan where E.A.T. artists and engineers collaborated to design and program an immersive dome
- A 1971 pilot project at Anand Dairy Cooperative, Baroda, India called "Utopia: Q&A" that consisted of public spaces linked by telex in New York, Ahmedabad, India, Tokyo, and Stockholm
- A pilot program to develop methods for recording indigenous culture in El Salvador
- The formation of a large screen outdoor television display system for Centre Georges Pompidou in Paris
- A collaboration with artists Fujiko Nakaya (1980) and Robert Rauschenberg (1989) to design sets for the Trisha Brown Dance Company.
- E.A.T. recently initiated a film restoration project to restore and edit the archival film material from 9 Evenings into ten films documenting the artists performances.

In 1972 Klüver, Barbara Rose and Julie Martin edited a book Pavilion that documented the design and construction of the Pepsi Pavilion for Expo '70 in Osaka, Japan.

In 2001 Klüver produced an exhibition of photo and text panels entitled "The Story of E.A.T.: Experiments in Art and Technology, 1960 - 2001 by Billy Klüver." It was first shown in Rome, then at Sonnabend Gallery in January 2002. The exhibition went to Lafayette College in the spring 2002, then to the Evolution Festival in Leeds, England, and University of Washington, in Seattle. In 2003 it traveled to San Diego State University in San Diego, California and then to a gallery in Santa Maria, California, run by Ardison Phillips who was the artist who managed the Pepsi Pavilion in 1970. From April to June 2003 a Japanese version was shown at a large exhibition at the NTT Intercommunication Center (ICC) in Tokyo which also included a number of object/artifacts and documents and E.A.T. posters, as well as works of art that Klüver and E.A.T. were involved in. A similar showing took place in Norrköping Museum of Art, Norrköping, Sweden in September 2004 and a small version was presented in 2008 at Stevens Institute of Technology.

=== Studies of Montparnasse ===
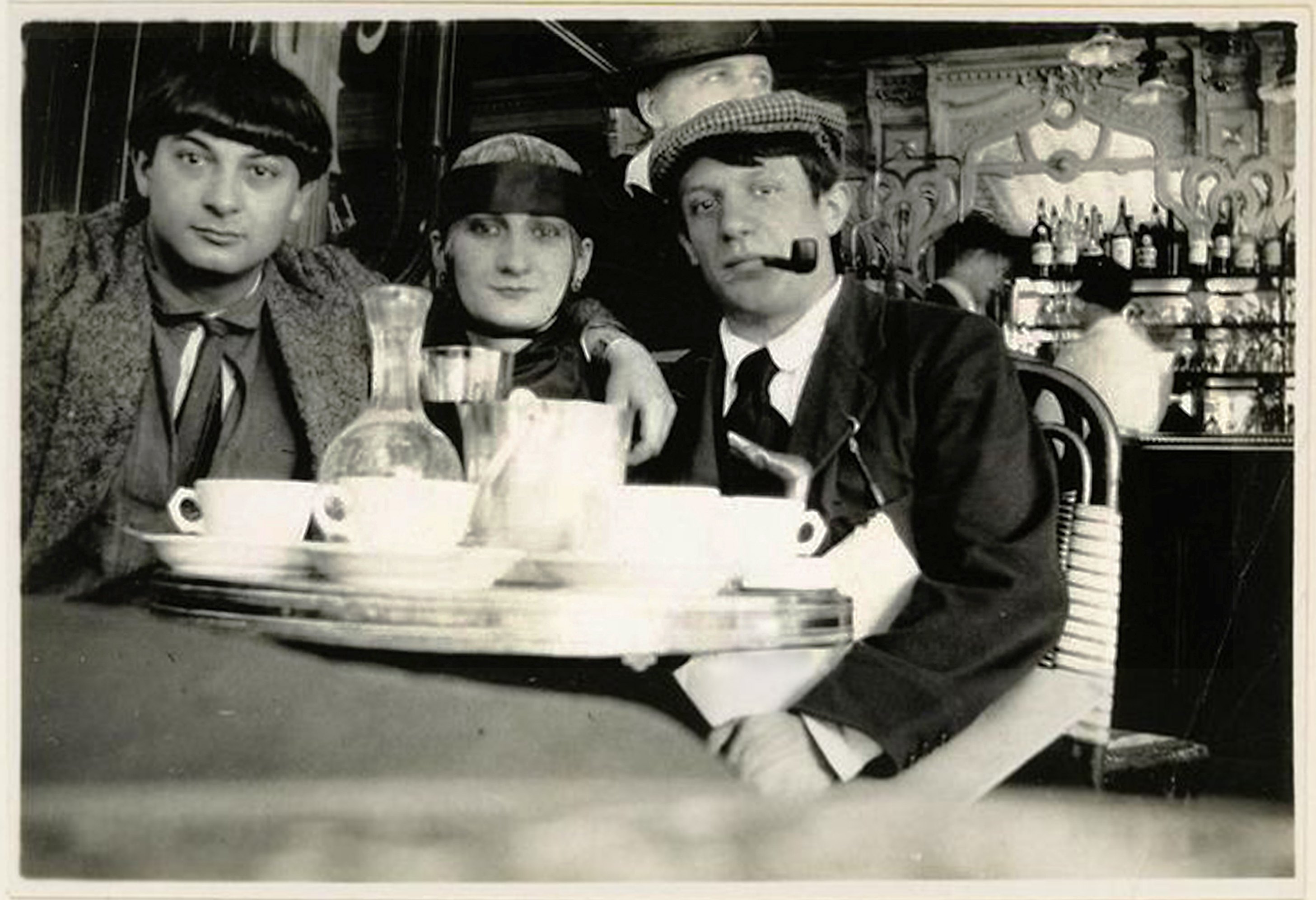
Jean Cocteau (August 1916) Moïse Kisling, actrice Pâquerette and Pablo Picasso at café La Rotonde, 105 Boulevard du Montparnasse. One of the series of photographs examined by Klüver in his A Day with Picasso

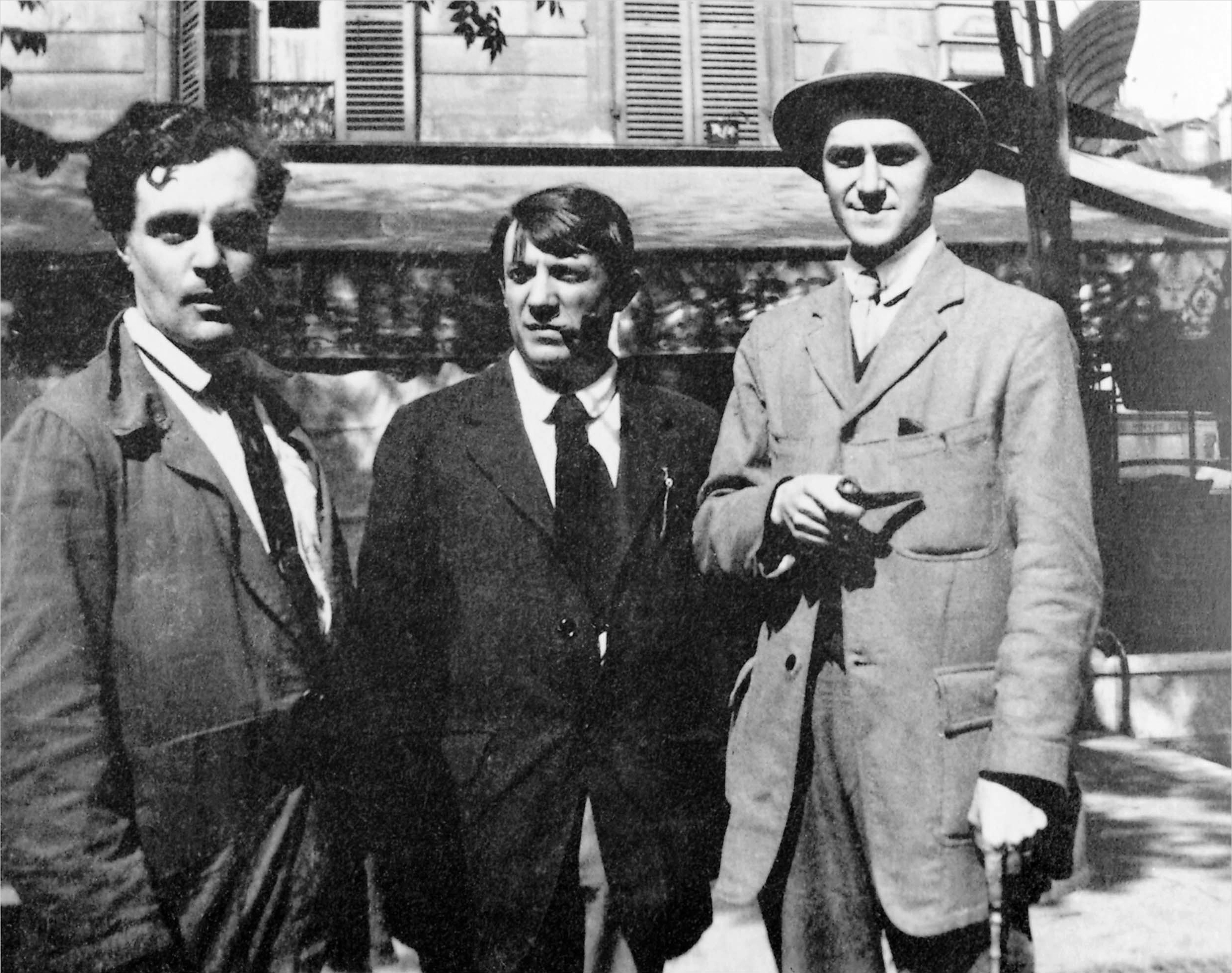
Jean Cocteau (August 1916) Modigliani, Picasso and André Salmon. One of the series of photographs examined by Klüver in his A Day with Picasso

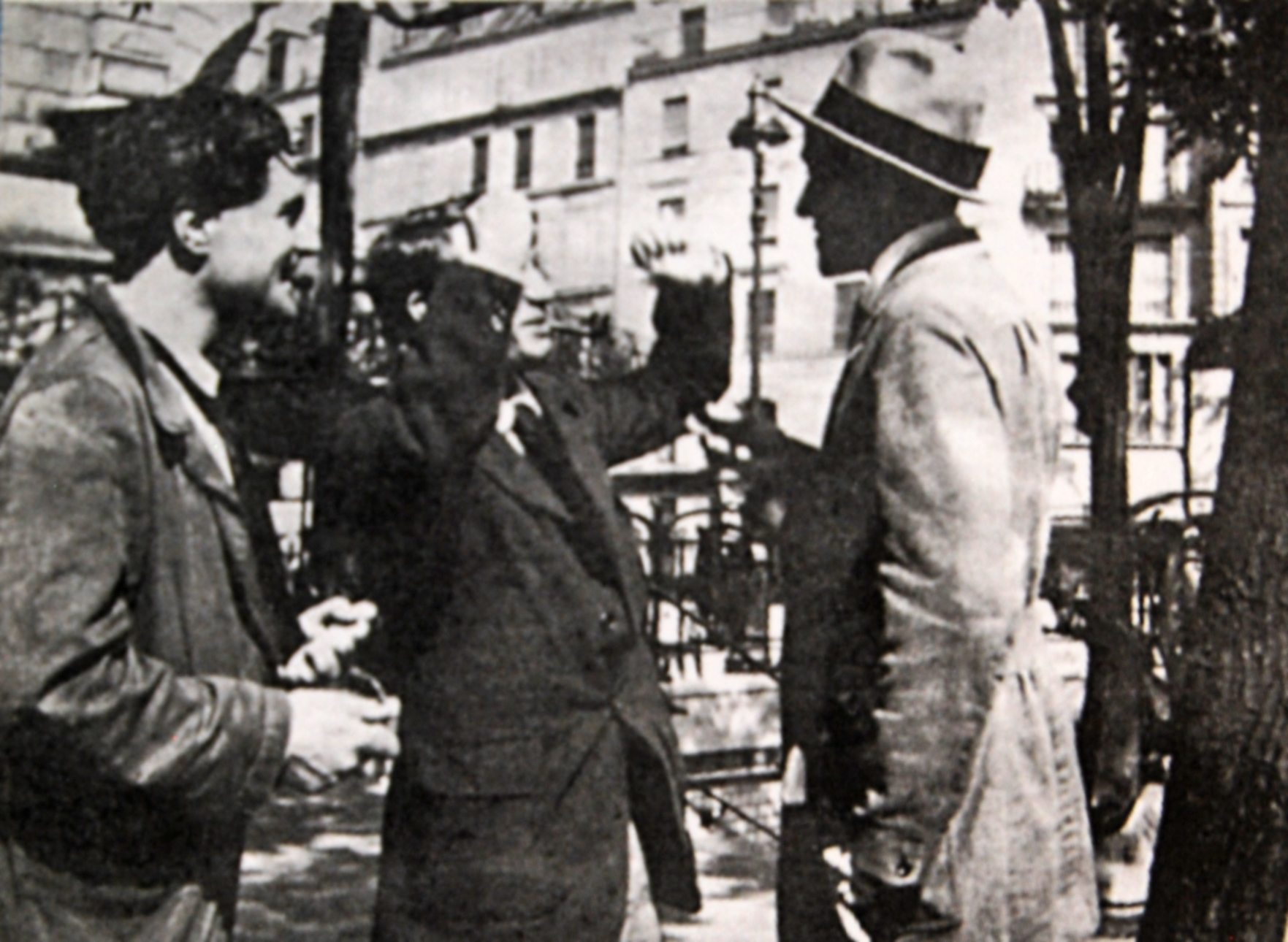
Jean Cocteau (August 1916) Amedeo Modigliani, Pablo Picasso and André Salmon in Montparnasse, Paris, a photograph examined in Klüver's book, A Day with Picasso

In 1978 Klüver began to work with his wife Julie Martin on a research project on the evolution of the art community in Montparnasse from 1880 to 1930. In 1989 the book Kiki's Paris was published in the United States, and subsequently appeared in France, Germany, Sweden, Spain, and Japan. Kiki was the pseudonym of Alice Prin.

Klüver and Julie Martin edited and annotated the original English translation of Kiki's Memoirs', published in 1930, but banned by U.S. Customs from the United States. It was issued by Ecco Press in Fall 1996; and in French by Editions Hazan in 1998.

Klüver's book, A Day with Picasso, published in 1997 in the U.S. (as well as in France, Germany. Brazil), was based on a group of photographs taken at lunch on a sunny afternoon in Montparnasse in 1916 by Jean Cocteau, of Pablo Picasso and Modigliani and friends including André Salmon, Max Jacob and Pâquerette, a model for the designer Paul Poiret. While Klüver in 1978 was researching material on the artists of Montparnasse in the 1910s and 1920s for Kiki’s Paris, he started collecting photographs of the period, noticing some that appeared to have been made together, with people dressed the same in each. He discovered 24 of these photographs and sequenced their events; the interpersonal relations of a small group in Paris vital to the Modernist era.

One that Klüver saw in a 1981 Modigliani exhibition inspired him to try to determine the exact dates and times when the pictures were taken by reading the shadows like a sundial. The images provided further clues; a uniformed man suggested that it was during WW1, the foliage on the trees indicated late spring or summer, and he recognised the awning of the Café de la Rotonde. He could identify Pablo Picasso (1881–1973), Amedeo Modigliani (1884–1920) and Moïse Kisling (1891–1953) and realised there was an exhibition in which all three participated; the Salon d’Antin of July 1916 in which Picasso showed Demoiselles d’Avignon. Thus, around or after the end of July was the most likely period in which these photographs could have been made.

Klüver set out to test whether measurements of the angles and lengths of shadows in the photographs could yield a closer date. He had already identified all the buildings as being on Boulevard du Montparnasse, with most unaltered since 1916. Using maps, making photographs and by physically measuring the buildings, their ledges or window insets, he calculated the sun's positions and plotted the results to get a spread of three weeks, with the most probable date being August 12. In 1983 he confirmed those findings with the Bureau des Longitudes.

Pierre Chanel, author of Album Cocteau (H. Veyrier, 1979) affirmed that the photographs were taken by Cocteau and provided a further six photographs from the series, dating the photographs to 1916 based on Cocteau's preface in a book on Modigliani:

”In 1916 during the war, it was Montparnasse. I was there through the mediation of Picasso. His windows overlooked the graves of the Montparnasse cemetery…. We went out and visited studios of the cubists. Our promenade took us to the Cafe de la Rotonde. The Rotonde, the Dome, and a restaurant at the corner of boulevards Raspail and Montparnasse formed a town square, where the vegetable sellers stopped their small carts and grass grew between the paving stones …. Nothing documents this except some photographs I took one morning at the Rotonde.”

Some of the negatives Kluver discovered had edge-fogging characteristic of the Autographic Kodak Junior manufactured between 1914 and 1927, and sold at a value 100 francs in 1916, and Cocteau's letters mention a Kodak given to him by his mother while he was fighting at the Front. A commercial photo lab had processed all of the films together however, and used a hole-punch numbering system to identify them. That confirmed that Cocteau had shot four rolls of 6 frames each. However, as each negative had been cut from the roll, they could not be used in providing a sequence. Instead, Klüver used use measurements of the shadows to determine the times and sequences of the series.

Chanel provided the identification of the rest of those depicted; Chilean painter Manuel Ortíz de Zárate (1887–1946) the military person who was Dadaist poet Henri-Pierre Roche (1979–1959), and the other woman was Russian painter Marie Wassilieff (1884–1957). Two earlier photographs Cocteau had taken of Erik Satie and Valentine Gross were shot before August 12, but on the same roll as the photographs he took in Montparnasse. Correspondence between Gross and Cocteau narrowed their date to August 10 or 11.

Klüver first published his findings in an article in Art in America. Reviewer Roy R. Behrens described Klüver's reconstruction in A Day With Picasso as "nearly as complete and fascinating as the forensic analysis of a crime scene." The book won Best Critical Study, in the 1998 Golden Light Book Award. The book was later published by Hakusuisha in Japan in 1999, and in Korea and Italy in 2000.

== Death ==
Billy Klüver died on January 11, 2004, at the age of 76. He was survived by his wife Julie Martin, a daughter Maja Klüver, and a son Kristian Patrik Klüver.

== Publications ==
- Klüver, Billy; Experiments in Art and Technology (Organization) (1967), Interface, artist/enginee, Experiments in Art and Technology
- Klüver, Billy; Experiments in Art and Technology (Organization) (1968), The artist and industry, Experiments in Art and Technology
- Klüver, Billy; Experiments in Art and Technology (Organization) (1971), Photographic recording of some optical effects in a 27.5 m. spherical mirror, Applied Optics
- Klüver, Billy; Experiments in Art and Technology (Organization) (1972), The future of art and technology, Experiments in Art and Technology
- Klüver, Billy; Experiments in Art and Technology (Organization) (1972), The future of art and technology, Experiments in Art and Technology
- Klüver, Billy; Experiments in Art and Technology (Organization) (1978), E.A.T. bibliography, 1966-1977, Experiments in Art and Technology, ISBN 978-0-931286-00-1
- Klüver, Billy; Experiments in Art and Technology (Organization) (1983), What are you working on now? : a pictorial memoir of the 60's, Experiments in Art and Technology, ISBN 978-0-931286-03-2
- Klüver, Billy; Martin, Julie (1985), Kiki's Paris : artists and lovers 1900-1930, Abrams, ISBN 978-0-8109-1210-6
- Klùver, B. (1986). 'A Day with Picasso'. In Art in America, 1986, 74, 9
- Billy Klüver (1997), A day with Picasso twenty-four photographs by Jean Cocteau, Cambridge, Mass MIT Press, ISBN 978-0-262-11228-4

== Awards and honors ==
- 1974 Order of Vasa, bestowed by the King of Sweden
- 1998 he received an honorary doctorate in Fine Arts from Parsons School of Design of the New School for Social Research
- 1998 Golden Light Book Award; Best Critical Study, for A Day With Picasso
- 2002 named Chevalier in the Ordre des Arts et des Lettres, by the French Government.

== See also ==
- Systems art
- Computer art
- Conceptual art
- Software art
- Systems thinking
- Knowledge visualization
- Experiments in Art and Technology.

== Bibliography ==
- Pavilion: Experiments in Art and Technology. Klüver, Billy, J. Martin, Barbara Rose (eds). New York: E. P. Dutton, 1972
- Marga Bijvoet, (1997) Art as Inquiry: Toward New Collaborations Between Art & Science, Oxford: Peter Lang
- Jack Burnham, (1970) Beyond Modern Sculpture: The Effects of Science and Technology on the Sculpture of this Century (New York: George Braziller Inc.
- Oliver Grau, Virtual Art, from Illusion to Immersion, MIT Press 2004, pp. 237–240, ISBN 0-262-57223-0
- Christiane Paul (2003). Digital Art (World of Art series). London: Thames & Hudson. ISBN 0-500-20367-9
- Wilson, Steve Information Arts: Intersections of Art, Science, and Technology ISBN 0-262-23209-X
- Kynaston McShine, "INFORMATION", New York, Museum of Modern Art., 1970, First Edition. ISBN LC 71-100683
- Jack Burnham, ‘Systems Esthetics,’ Artforum (September, 1968); reprinted in Donna de Salvo (ed.), Open Systems: Rethinking Art C. 1970 (London: Tate, 2005)
- Edward A. Shanken, ‘Art in the Information Age: Technology and Conceptual Art,’ in Michael Corris (ed.), Conceptual Art: Theory, Myth and Practice (Cambridge: Cambridge University Press, 2004).
- Frank Popper (1993) Art of the Electronic Age, Thames and Hudson Ltd., London, and Harry N. Abrams Inc, New York, ISBN 0-8109-1928-1
- Charlie Gere (2002) Digital Culture, Reaktion ISBN 978-1-86189-143-3
- Jill Johnston, (2004) Billy Kluver, 1927-2004 Artworld Obituary in Art in America, March issue 2004
- Charlie Gere (2005) Art, Time and Technology: Histories of the Disappearing Body, Berg, pp. 124 & 166
- Catherine Morris (ed.), Clarisse Bardiot, Michelle Kuo, Lucy Lippard, Brian O'Doherty, (2006). 9 Evenings Reconsidered (Cambridge: MIT List Visual Arts Center), ISBN 978-0-938437-69-7
- Kristine Stiles & Peter Selz, Theories and Documents of Contemporary Art: A Sourcebook of Artists' Writings (Second Edition, Revised and Expanded by Kristine Stiles) University of California Press 2012, Klüver text Theater and Engineering - an Experiment: Notes by an Engineer, pp. 480–483
