= Seian University of Art and Design =

- 成安造形大学
- Type: Private
- Established: 1993
- Location: Ōtsu, Shiga Prefecture, Japan
- Website: www.seian.ac.jp

Seian University of Art and Design (成安造形大学 (Seian Zōkei Daigaku)) is a private art and design university in Ōtsu, Shiga Prefecture, Japan. The institution traces its origins to educational initiatives founded in Kyoto in 1920 by Chika Seo.

== History ==
The university's affiliated educational lineage began in 1920 with the establishment of a sewing school in Kyoto. A women's junior college opened in 1950. Seian University of Art and Design was established as a coeducational university in 1993 in Shiga Prefecture.

== Academics ==
The university offers art- and design-focused instruction organized into multiple areas/courses (commonly described as six areas with a range of specialized courses).

== Accreditation and evaluation ==
Seian University of Art and Design has undergone institutional evaluation by the Japan Institution for Higher Education Evaluation (JIHEE).

== Campus ==
The campus is located in Ōtsu, Shiga Prefecture.
