= Fred Waldhauer =

American electrical engineer

Frederick (Fred) Donald Waldhauer (1927–1993) was an American electrical engineer known for his work in hearing aids and combining art and technology.

== Biography ==
Waldhauer was born on December 6, 1927, and grew up in Brooklyn, New York, United States. He received his bachelor's degree in electrical engineering from Cornell University and his master's degree in electrical engineering from Columbia University.

Much of Waldhauer's career was focused on telephony and digital transmission, including work on T1 carrier systems. From 1948 to 1956, he was at RCA. From 1956 to 1987, he was a member of technical staff at Bell Telephone Laboratories in Holmdel. He published numerous technical and scientific papers on feedback and high-speed digital transmission, as well as writing a book on feedback theory, and early transistor design. He holds more than 14 patents.

Waldhauer became a Fellow of the IEEE in 1977, and was a longtime member of the Audio Engineering Society. In addition to his professional memberships, Mr Waldhauer was a professional engineer in the state of New Jersey and a patent attorney.

In Waldhauer's latter years, at Bell Laboratories, his efforts focused on advanced hearing aid design and technology.

After retiring from Bell Laboratories, Waldhauer continuing work on hearing aid designs at what became Resound (acquired in October 2006 by GN (Great Northern) corporation). Waldhauer's work on programmable multi-band compression at Bell Laboratories, and later at Resound, represented a fundamental shift in hearing aid design that still exists today.

== Work ==
=== 9 Evenings: Theatre and Engineering ===
Waldhauer, Billy Klüver and artists Robert Rauschenberg and Robert Whitman collaborated in 1966 organizing 9 Evenings: Theatre and Engineering, a series of performances that united artists and engineers. The performances were held in New York City's 69th Regiment Armory, on Lexington Avenue between 25th and 26th Streets, as an homage to the original and historical 1913 Armory show. Ten artists worked with more than 30 engineers to produce art performances incorporating new technology.

=== Experiments in art and technology ===
In 1966, Waldhauer, Robert Rauschenberg, Robert Whitman and Billy Klüver founded Experiments in Art and Technology (E.A.T.) a not-for-profit service organization for artists and engineers. E.A.T. established a Technical Services Program to provide artists with technical information and assistance by matching them with engineers and scientists who can collaborate with them. While working with E.A.T. he helped create the Moon Museum.

== Publications ==
Books

- Arthur W. Lo, Richard O. Endres, Jakob Zawels, Fred D. Waldhauer, Chung-Chih Cheng Transistor Electronics, Prentice Hall Inc., 521 pages.
- Fred D. Waldhauer, Feedback, Wiley-Interscience, 651 pages, ISBN 0-471-05319-8 Description: 1982.

Articles

- Irwin Dorros, Jack M. Sipress, and Fred Waldhauer. "An experimental 224 Mb/s digital repeatered line." Bell System Technical Journal 45.7 (1966): 993–1043.
- Fred Waldhauer & Edgar Villchur "Full Dynamic Range Multiband Compression In a Hearing Aid", The Hearing Journal, September 1988, relates to dynamic range compression.

List of US Patents (incomplete)

- 6101258, 5524056, 5278912
