= List of Guggenheim Fellowships awarded in 2025 =

The following is a list of Guggenheim Fellowships awarded in 2025:

Fellow	Category	Field of Study
Karen Graubart	Humanities	African Studies
Yannis Hamilakis	Social Sciences	Anthropology & Cultural Studies
Karen Strassler	Social Sciences	Anthropology & Cultural Studies
Dominic Boyer	Social Sciences	Anthropology & Cultural Studies
Carolyn Rouse	Social Sciences	Anthropology & Cultural Studies
Martin Julius Murray	Humanities	Architecture, Planning, & Design
Thomas Conlan	Humanities	Asian Studies
Benjamin Brose	Humanities	Asian Studies
Merav Opher	Natural Sciences	Astronomy–Astrophysics
Saurabh W. Jha	Natural Sciences	Astronomy–Astrophysics
Gregg Hecimovich	Creative Arts	Biography
Larisa DeSantis	Natural Sciences	Biology
Marcus Kronforst	Natural Sciences	Biology
Markita del Carpio Landry	Natural Sciences	Chemistry
Jeanine Durning	Choreography	Creative Arts
Donald Byrd	Choreography	Creative Arts
Monica Bill Barnes	Choreography	Creative Arts
Gwen Welliver	Choreography	Creative Arts
Merián Soto	Choreography	Creative Arts
Leslie Cuyjet	Choreography	Creative Arts
Stephanie García	Choreography	Creative Arts
Robbie Saenz de Viteri	Choreography	Creative Arts
Sasha Alexandra Marta Ivanochko	Choreography	Creative Arts
John Ma	Classics	Humanities
Stephanie McCarter	Classics	Humanities
Park Williams	Climate Studies	Natural Sciences
Swarat Chaudhuri	Computer Science	Natural Sciences
Mark Aaron Graber	Constitutional Studies	Social Sciences
Jingyi Jessica Li	Data Science	Natural Sciences
Rubén Polendo	Drama & Performance Art	Creative Arts
Erik Ehn	Drama & Performance Art	Creative Arts
Lars Jan	Drama & Performance Art	Creative Arts
Abigail Browde	Drama & Performance Art	Creative Arts
Michael Silverstone	Drama & Performance Art	Creative Arts
Carolina Lithgow-Bertelloni	Earth Science	Natural Sciences
Harrison Hong	Economics	Social Sciences
Tracy Steffes	Education	Social Sciences
Mona Jarrahi	Engineering	Natural Sciences
Angela Esterhammer	English Literature	Humanities
M. Cecilia Gaposchkin	European & Latin American History	Humanities
Paul Christesen	European & Latin American History	Humanities
Sheila Heti	Fiction	Creative Arts
Tania Rachel James	Fiction	Creative Arts
Nicole Krauss	Fiction	Creative Arts
Jonathan Lethem	Fiction	Creative Arts
Nell Zink	Fiction	Creative Arts
Katie Kitamura	Fiction	Creative Arts
Christine Smallwood	Fiction	Creative Arts
Marie-Helene Bertino	Fiction	Creative Arts
Miranda July	Fiction	Creative Arts
Nana Kwame Adjei-Brenyah	Fiction	Creative Arts
Patrick Keating	Film, Video, & New Media Studies	Creative Arts
Matías Gustavo Piñeiro	Film-Video	Creative Arts
Joshua Bonnetta	Film-Video	Creative Arts
Travis Wilkerson	Film-Video	Creative Arts
Rea Midori Tajiri	Film-Video	Creative Arts
Mungo Thomson	Film-Video	Creative Arts
Jessica Bardsley	Film-Video	Creative Arts
Donna Conlon	Film-Video	Creative Arts
Talia Lugacy	Film-Video	Creative Arts
Carl Elsaesser	Film-Video	Creative Arts
Rajee Ranpathi Samarasinghe	Film-Video	Creative Arts
Daïchi Saïto	Film-Video	Creative Arts
Alina Simone	Film-Video	Creative Arts
Violet Du Feng	Film-Video	Creative Arts
Antonio Tibaldi	Film-Video	Creative Arts
Ira Eduardovna	Film-Video	Creative Arts
Nadia Shihab	Film-Video	Creative Arts
Jordan Strafer	Film-Video	Creative Arts
Raven Jackson	Film-Video	Creative Arts
Ester Partegàs	Fine Arts	Creative Arts
Daniel Anastassov Bozhkov	Fine Arts	Creative Arts
Julie Tolentino	Fine Arts	Creative Arts
Jilaine Jones	Fine Arts	Creative Arts
Mildred Howard	Fine Arts	Creative Arts
Katarina Burin	Fine Arts	Creative Arts
Kathleen McShane	Fine Arts	Creative Arts
Lucas Blalock	Fine Arts	Creative Arts
Marc Handelman	Fine Arts	Creative Arts
Theaster Gates	Fine Arts	Creative Arts
Ulrike Mueller	Fine Arts	Creative Arts
Molly Springfield	Fine Arts	Creative Arts
Raul Guerrero	Fine Arts	Creative Arts
Selena Roy Kimball	Fine Arts	Creative Arts
Sara Cwynar	Fine Arts	Creative Arts
Kamrooz Aram	Fine Arts	Creative Arts
Coleman Collins	Fine Arts	Creative Arts
Josh Faught	Fine Arts	Creative Arts
Anna Mayer	Fine Arts	Creative Arts
Charisse Weston	Fine Arts	Creative Arts
B. Ingrid Olson	Fine Arts	Creative Arts
Kyungmi Shin	Fine Arts	Creative Arts
Lynne Allen	Fine Arts	Creative Arts
Hong Hong	Fine Arts	Creative Arts
Teresa Baker	Fine Arts	Creative Arts
Maryam Safajoo	Fine Arts	Creative Arts
Emily Barker	Fine Arts	Creative Arts
York Chang	Fine Arts	Creative Arts
Carolyn Castaño	Fine Arts	Creative Arts
Lauren Bon	Fine Arts	Creative Arts
Tom Burr	Fine Arts	Creative Arts
Azza El Siddique	Fine Arts	Creative Arts
David J. Getsy	Fine Arts Research	Humanities
Elizabeth Otto	Fine Arts Research	Humanities
Ana Lucia Araujo	Fine Arts Research	Humanities
Michael Tisserand	General Nonfiction	Creative Arts
Rachel Shteir	General Nonfiction	Creative Arts
Andrew Seth Meier	General Nonfiction	Creative Arts
Louis Onuorah Chude-Sokei	General Nonfiction	Creative Arts
Nathaniel Rich	General Nonfiction	Creative Arts
Carolyn Dever	General Nonfiction	Creative Arts
Kristen Radtke	General Nonfiction	Creative Arts
Kerry Howley	General Nonfiction	Creative Arts
Sloane Crosley	General Nonfiction	Creative Arts
Harold Holzer	General Nonfiction	Creative Arts
Jessica Barnes	Geography & Environmental Studies	Natural Sciences
Douglas Arthur Edmonds	Geography & Environmental Studies	Natural Sciences
Jim Downs	History of Science, Technology, & Economics	Humanities
James Morton Turner	History of Science, Technology, & Economics	Humanities
Larissa FastHorse	Indigenous Studies	Humanities
Quinn Slobodian	Intellectual & Cultural History	Humanities
Marcia Chatelain	Intellectual & Cultural History	Humanities
Laura Beers	Intellectual & Cultural History	Humanities
Oona Hathaway	Law	Social Sciences
Kellen Funk	Law	Social Sciences
Ahmad Al-Jallad	Linguistics	Humanities
Rhodri Lewis	Literary Criticism	Humanities
Jonathan Bate	Literary Criticism	Humanities
Maria Chudnovsky	Mathematics	Natural Sciences
Rita F. Redberg	Medicine & Health	Natural Sciences
Paule Valery Joseph	Medicine & Health	Natural Sciences
Thomas E. Burman	Medieval & Early Modern Studies	Humanities
Katherine Jansen	Medieval & Early Modern Studies	Humanities
Mara Mathilda Helmuth	Music Composition	Creative Arts
Caroline Davis	Music Composition	Creative Arts
Krzysztof Wolek	Music Composition	Creative Arts
Huang Ruo	Music Composition	Creative Arts
Michael Dease	Music Composition	Creative Arts
Wang Xinyang	Music Composition	Creative Arts
David Virelles	Music Composition	Creative Arts
John Yao	Music Composition	Creative Arts
Katherine Balch	Music Composition	Creative Arts
Tomás Ignacio Gueglio Saccone	Music Composition	Creative Arts
Peter S. Shin	Music Composition	Creative Arts
yuniya edi kwon	Music Composition	Creative Arts
Gwen Laster	Music Composition	Creative Arts
Holland Andrews	Music Composition	Creative Arts
Roger Mathew Grant	Music Research	Humanities
Aubrey Kelly	Neuroscience	Natural Sciences
Hannah Ginsborg	Philosophy	Humanities
Simon Huttegger	Philosophy	Humanities
James G. Dwyer	Philosophy	Humanities
Carla Williams	Photography	Creative Arts
Justin Maxon	Photography	Creative Arts
Accra Shepp	Photography	Creative Arts
Nina Berman	Photography	Creative Arts
Eli Durst	Photography	Creative Arts
Mikael Levin	Photography	Creative Arts
Marzena Abrahamik	Photography	Creative Arts
Tommy Kha	Photography	Creative Arts
Miranda Lichtenstein	Photography	Creative Arts
Phil Chang	Photography	Creative Arts
Richard T. Walker	Photography	Creative Arts
Denis Defibaugh	Photography	Creative Arts
Martine Gutierrez	Photography	Creative Arts
Shoshannah White	Photography	Creative Arts
Sabiha Çimen	Photography	Creative Arts
Dionne Lee	Photography	Creative Arts
Farah Al Qasimi	Photography	Creative Arts
Anders W. Sandvik	Physics	Natural Sciences
Feliciano Giustino	Physics	Natural Sciences
francine j. harris	Poetry	Creative Arts
Cynthia Cruz	Poetry	Creative Arts
David Dalton Yezzi	Poetry	Creative Arts
Matthew Cooperman	Poetry	Creative Arts
Richie Hofmann	Poetry	Creative Arts
Corey Van Landingham	Poetry	Creative Arts
Dan Albergotti	Poetry	Creative Arts
Jessica Jacobs	Poetry	Creative Arts
Mihaela Moscaliuc	Poetry	Creative Arts
Brandon Som	Poetry	Creative Arts
Matthew Stephen Levendusky	Political Science	Social Sciences
Gretchen Helmke	Political Science	Social Sciences
Timothy Verstynen	Psychology	Social Sciences
Tulasi Srinivas	Religion	Humanities
Annette Yoshiko Reed	Religion	Humanities
Dianne M. Stewart	Religion	Humanities
Sheri Fink	Science Writing	Natural Sciences
Bijal P. Trivedi	Science Writing	Natural Sciences
Molly Brunson	Slavic Studies	Humanities
Christopher Muller	Sociology	Social Sciences
Matthew Isaac Cohen	Theatre Arts & Performance Studies	Humanities
Suk-Young Kim	Theatre Arts & Performance Studies	Humanities
Paul Reitter	Translation	Humanities
Kristin Hoganson	U.S. History	Humanities
Martha S. Jones	U.S. History	Humanities
Bruce J. Schulman	U.S. History	Humanities
Nicole Eustace	U.S. History	Humanities
