= List of alumni of Oxford Brookes University =

A list of alumni of note from Oxford Brookes University in Oxford, England.

== List ==
- Edward Abel – cricketer
- Maitha Al Mahrouqi – Undersecretary for Tourism in Oman
- Masih Alinejad – Iranian-American journalist, author, and women's rights activist
- Adeel Akhtar – actor, and BAFTA award winner
- Peace Anyiam-Osigwe – lawyer and the founder of Africa Movie Academy Awards.
- Lady Margarita Armstrong-Jones – granddaughter of Princess Margaret and grand-niece of Queen Elizabeth II
- Prince Azim of Brunei (1982–2020)
- Daniel Battsek – film producer and executive
- Daniel Bigham - former track cyclist, currently aerodynamics engineer
- Freddie Boath – former actor, now marketing and advertising professional,
- Nicolette Boele – Australian independent MP
- Aimé Boji – Democratic Republic of the Congo Budget Minister
- Julen Bollain – Economist and professor. Former Podemos MP.
- Burna Boy – Musician
- Duncan Bradshaw – cricketer
- Liam Brown – author
- Beatrice Catanzaro – Italian artist
- Richard Chambers – Olympic rower and World Champion 2007, 2010
- Millie Clode – Sky Sports News presenter
- Paul Conneally – poet, artist and educationalist
- Ed Cowan – cricketer
- Caroline Davis – academic
- Jonathan Djanogly – Conservative MP
- Scott Durant - Olympic gold medal winner in rowing, 2016
- Afi Ekong – Nigerian artist, arts promoter
- Robert Evans – writer
- Lynne Featherstone – former Liberal Democrat MP; Parliamentary Under-Secretary of State for International Development
- Christos Floros - Architect, politician
- Justin Forsyth – Chief Executive of Save the Children
- Andy Gomarsall – England rugby union player
- Dave Goulson – biologist
- Jonny Greenwood – founding member of Radiohead
- Jonathan Gullis – Former Conservative MP for Stoke-on-Trent North
- Theyazin bin Haitham – Crown Prince of Oman
- Patrick Hall – former MP
- Alastair Heathcote – GB rower, Olympic silver medal 2008
- Edward Holcroft – Actor, star of Kingsman: The Secret Service, Alias Grace (miniseries), and The Undeclared War.
- Melody Hossaini – youth sector consultant; candidate on The Apprentice series seven
- Marc Hudson – vocalist for the band DragonForce
- Aaron Jeavons – cricketer
- Tom Johnson – England Rugby Union player
- Chris Kelly – Conservative Member of Parliament for Dudley South
- Alexander James Kent – President of the British Cartographic Society and advisor to UNESCO
- Yasmeen Lari – first woman architect in Pakistan and advisor to UNESCO
- Tom Lucy – Welsh rower, silver medallist at the 2008 Summer Olympics
- Danny Manu – British engineer and tech entrepreneur
- Vinny Marcos – Youngest son of Bongbong Marcos
- David Mayer de Rothschild – environmentalist
- Louis Ng – Member of Parliament (MP) for Nee Soon Group Representation Constituency (GRC) (Singapore Parliament Constituency)
- Caroline O'Connor – rowing cox
- Adaora Onyechere, Nigerian TV/radio presenter, entrepreneur, motivational speaker and author
- Jay Osgerby – designer, co-designer of the London 2012 Olympic Torch
- Alex Partridge – rower, member of winning coxless four, World Rowing Championships 2005 and 2006
- Annabel Port – radio broadcaster
- George Pringle – musician and artist
- Gilbert Proesch – artist, of Gilbert & George
- Adrian Reynard – motorsport driver and entrepreneur
- Matt Richardson – comedian and presenter
- Steve Ridgway – CEO of Virgin Atlantic
- Susan Roaf – Architect of Oxford Ecohouse with the first photovoltaic cell roof installed in Britain
- Georgina Rylance – actress
- Gurdeep Samra – music producer
- Prince Shivraj Singh – Crown Prince of Jodhpur; polo player
- Lady Araminta Spencer-Churchill – equestrian
- Michael Fenton Stevens – actor
- Roma Tearne – artist, novelist and filmmaker
- Justin Tomlinson – Conservative Member of Parliament for North Swindon
- Guillaume Veillet – French ethnomusicologist and music writer
- Steve Williams – twice Olympic gold medal winner in rowing, 2004 and 2008
- Richard Younger-Ross – Liberal Democrat Member of Parliament for Teignbridge
- Aseefa Bhutto Zardari – First Lady of Pakistan
