= Caroline Davis =

Caroline Davis may refer to:

- Caroline Bilton née Davis, British television presenter
- Caroline Davis (saxophonist), saxophonist, flutist, composer, and educator
- Caroline Davis (publishing), British academic who specialises in the history of publishing culture
