= Karla Grosch =

German gymnastics teacher and dancer (1904–1933)

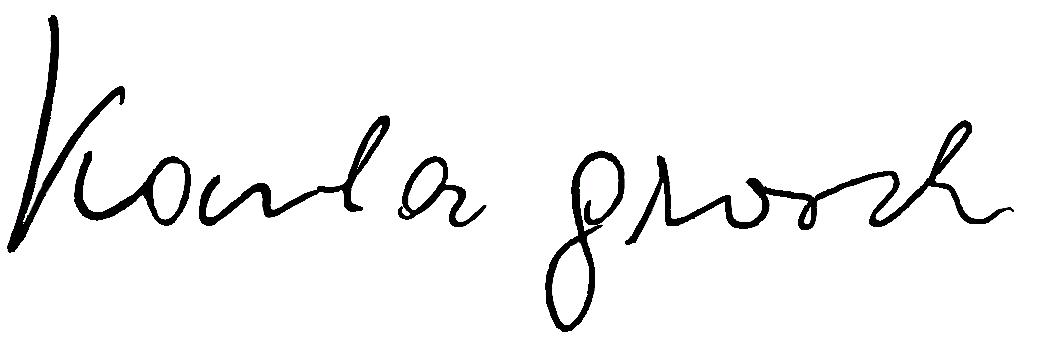
Signature Karla Grosch (1904–1933)

Karla Grosch (June 1, 1904 – May 8, 1933) was a German gymnastics teacher and dancer.

== Life ==
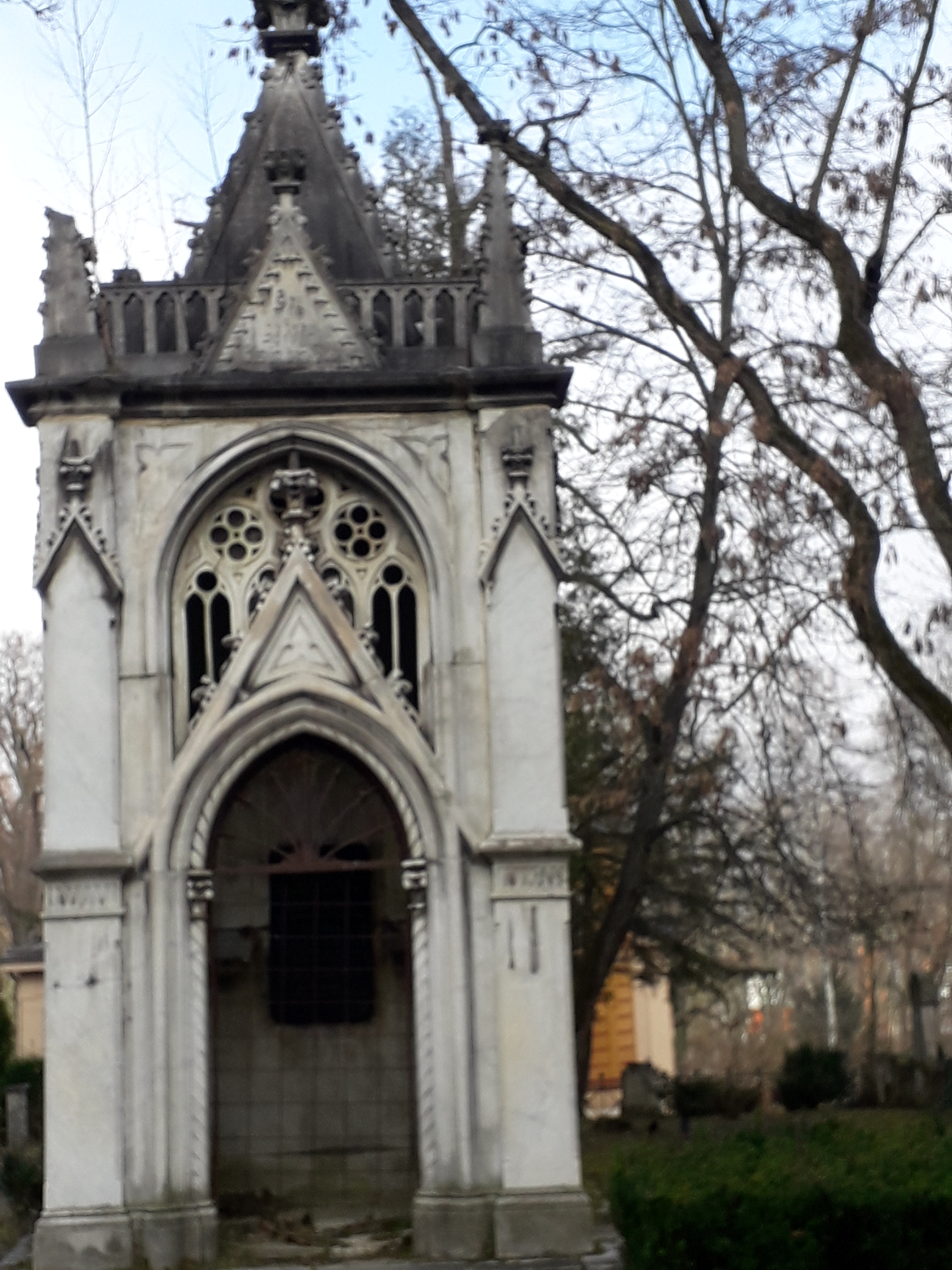
The grave of Rudolf Grosch's family in the Historical Cemetery in Weimar

Grosch was born in 1904 in Weimar. She was the daughter of wealthy Weimar lamp manufacturer and city councilor Rudolf Grosch.

In 1921 she attended the newly founded dance school of Gret Palucca in Dresden. Around 1923, she completed an apprenticeship as a wood sculptor in Weimar. In 1928 she joined Gunta Stölzl as the second female teacher at the Bauhaus in Dessau, where she worked as a gymnastics instructor for the female Bauhaus students. The introduction of physical education was initiated by the new Bauhaus director Hannes Meyer. She also performed as a dancer in the stage class under Oskar Schlemmer. Her performances in 1929, such as Metalltanz and Glastanz (Metal or Glass Dance), were documented by iconic photos taken by T. Lux Feininger and Robert Binnemann. She appears in many Bauhaus photographs, including a 1930 press photo from the magazine Die Woche, where she was portrayed as the "typical Bauhaus girl".

From September 1928 to 1930 she lived in a room in Paul Klee's Meisterhaus, where she served as a "Haustochter" (house daughter), a kind of unpaid in-house assistant similar to an au pair. Her teaching career ended in September 1932 with the closure of the Bauhaus in Dessau.

And the joy of the body has remained with me through my work. I feel a childlike joy when I feel how I have control over my body, how I can make demands on it, how it yields, functions, and I can lose myself completely in its capabilities. A large part of my excess energy is released in this way.

— Karla Grosch, quoted in Seraina Graf: Karla Grosch,

In the spring of 1933 she emigrated with her Austrian fiancé Franz Aichinger to Mandatory Palestine. He had studied architecture at the Bauhaus under Hannes Meyer and Mies van der Rohe.

Shortly after her arrival, she died in Tel Aviv in a bathing accident. Grosch was pregnant at the time.

The family grave in the Historical Cemetery in Weimar does not mention her name on the main gravestone, but it appears on an inscription directly below it. The inscription was commissioned by her sister Paula Grosch (1903–1993) in the 1930s.

== Literature ==
- Seraina Graf: Karla Grosch – Eine Spurensuche. In: Zwitscher-Maschine. Journal on Paul Klee, 2018, issue 5, pp. 17–46. (in German)
- Patrick Rössler, Elizabeth Otto: Frauen am Bauhaus. Wegweisende Künstlerinnen der Moderne. Knesebeck, Munich 2019, pp. 121–126. ISBN 978-3-95728-230-9. (in German)
