= Marianne Brandt =

German artist and designer (1893–1983)

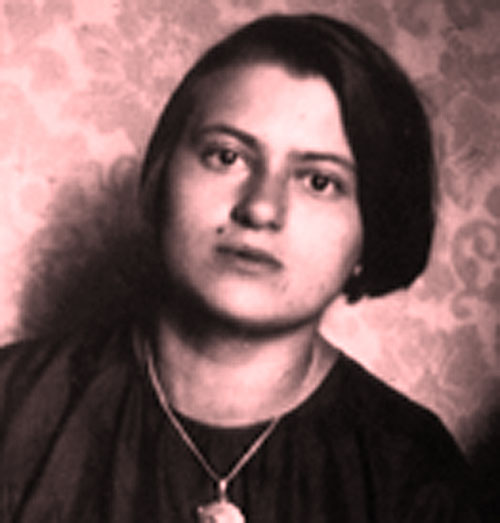
- Born: Marianne Liebe; 1 October 1893; Chemnitz, German Empire
- Died: 18 June 1983 (aged 89); Kirchberg, East Germany
- Education: Bauhaus (Weimar School)
- Known for: industrial design, painting, sculpture, photography
- Spouse(s): Erik Brandt, 1919–1935 (divorced)

Marianne Brandt (1 October 1893 – 18 June 1983) was a German painter, sculptor, photographer, metalsmith, and designer who studied at the Bauhaus art school in Weimar and later became head of the Bauhaus Metall-Werkstatt (Metal Workshop) in Dessau in 1928. Today, Brandt's designs for household objects such as lamps and ashtrays are considered timeless examples of modern industrial design. Although she pursued painting early in life and attended a private art school and the Grand Ducal College of Art in Weimar from 1911–1917, where she produced many works in the Expressionists style and also studied sculpture, the artist is best known for her sleek and elegant industrial designs.Brandt also worked with photography at the Bauhaus, taking photographs that featured unusual angles—in particular, self-portraits—and disorienting and distorting reflections in glass and metal surfaces.She worked as head of the design department of the company Ruppelwerk Metallwarenfabrik GmbH in Gotha until 1932. In 1949, she worked at the University of Applied Arts (now the Berlin Weißensee School of Art) until 1954. In the year, 1954 she also supervised the exhibition The German applied art of the GDR in Beijing and Shanghai in 1953–54. She also created photomontages.

== Biography ==
Brandt was born into a prominent family in Chemnitz as Marianne Liebe. Brandt studied painting and sculpture at the Weimar Saxon Grand Ducal Art School from 1911 to 1917. In 1919 she married the Norwegian painter Erik Brandt. From 1919–1920 she and her husband lived abroad, first for a year in Norway, before embarking on a one-year study tour to Paris and the south of France. She studied and taught at the Bauhaus in Weimar and Dessau from 1923 to 1929. Between her studies at these two schools, Brandt worked as a freelance artist. She studied painting with the artists Fritz Mackensen and Robert Weise before studying sculpture with Robert Engelmann.

She trained as a painter before joining the Weimar Bauhaus in January of 1924, where she attended classes with Josef Albers, Wassily Kandinsky, and Paul Klee, among others, before joining the metal workshop in summer of the same year. There she became a student of Hungarian modernist theorist and designer László Moholy-Nagy. Although the Bauhaus claimed to welcome “any person of good repute, without regard to age or sex”, there was still a strong gender bias, and she ultimately became the only woman to attain her degree in the metal workshop. She quickly rose to the position of workshop assistant; when Moholy-Nagy left the Bauhaus in 1928, she became the workshop's acting director, serving in the post for one year and negotiating some of the most important Bauhaus contracts for collaborations with industry. These contracts for the production of lights and other metal workshop designs were a rare example of one of the workshops helping to fund the school. One of her lasting contributions are the lamp fittings that she and Max Krajewski designed for the Bauhaus building in Dessau.

After leaving the Bauhaus for Berlin in 1929, Brandt worked for Walter Gropius in his Berlin studio. From late 1929 through 1932, Brandt was head of design at the Ruppel Metal Goods factory in Gotha, Germany, until she lost her job due to the ongoing Great Depression.

Brandt’s interest in photography began in 1923 with a self-portrait, Selbstportät mit Lilien (Self-Portrait with Lilies). 1929 was a particularly productive year for her photography and she became active with the Bauhaus magazine.

Early in 1933, at the beginning of the Nazi period in Germany, Brandt first attempted to find work outside of the country, but family responsibilities called her back to Chemnitz. She was unable to find steady employment throughout the Nazi period. In 1939 she became a member of the "Reichskulturkammer," the Nazi regime's official artists' organisation, in order to obtain art supplies, which would otherwise have been forbidden to her. However, Brandt was never a member of the Nazi Party. After many years of living apart, she and Erik Brandt officially divorced in 1935.

After World War II, Brandt remained in Chemnitz to help rebuild her family's home, which had been severely damaged in the bombings. She lived out her days in East Germany, and died in Kirchberg, Saxony, at the age of 89. At the invitation of Mart Stam, from 1949 to 1951 Brandt was a lecturer at the Dresden Academy of Fine Arts. She taught at the Academy of Applied Art in Berlin from 1951 to 1954.

== Work ==
Brandt's designs for metal ashtrays, tea and coffee services, lamps, and other household objects are now recognized as among the best of the Weimar and Dessau Bauhaus. Further, they were among the few Bauhaus designs to be mass-produced during the interwar period, and several of them are currently available as reproductions. In an auction in December 2007, one of her teapots —the Model No. MT49 tea infuser—was sold for a record-breaking $361,000.

Beginning in 1926, Brandt also produced a body of photomontage work, though all but a few were not publicly known until the 1970s after she had abandoned the Bauhaus style and was living in Communist East Germany. Some of the photomontages came to public attention after Bauhaus historian Eckhard Neumann solicited the early experiments, stimulated by resurgent interest in modernist experiment in the West. These photomontages often focus on the complex situation of women in the interwar period, a time when they enjoyed new freedoms in work, fashion and sexuality, yet frequently experienced traditional prejudices.

In 1926, Brandt moved with the Bauhaus to Dessau and a year later took charge of lighting design with the metal workshop, before becoming its director from 1928 to 1929. Much of Brandt’s energy was directed into her lighting designs, including collaborations with small number of Bauhaus colleagues and students. One of her early projects was the ME78B hanging lamp (1926). This elegant pendant light made of aluminum featured a simple saucer shade combined with an innovative pulley system and counter-weight, which allowed the height of the lamp to be adjusted with ease; the pendant was used in multiple locations in the Dessau campus, including the metal, weaving and architecture department, as well as the dining room of Gropius’s own house.

During the 1930s and 1940s, Brandt lived in near isolation, despite having many opportunities available to her after her time at Bauhaus. She had just finished showing five photographs at the famed "FiFo" (Film and Photography) exhibition put on by Werkbund. The section her work was shown in was curated by her former mentor Moholy-Nagy. After traveling from job to job and project to project, Brandt lived in her hometown of Chemnitz for sixteen years and did not have any official position. She still produced work, but it was not for a specific purpose or commission. Having picked up painting again during the Nazi period, she continued to paint during the GDR, in both watercolour and tempera. These materials were cheaper and the pieces could be completed more quickly. The paintings are sometimes melancholy and depressing, but this is not surprising considering their timing during her unemployment and the Nazi period.

Brandt is also remembered as a pioneering photographer. She created experimental still-life compositions, but it is her series of self-portraits which are particularly striking. These often represent her as a strong and independent New Woman of the Bauhaus; other examples show her face and body distorted across the curved and mirrored surfaces of metal balls, creating a blended image of herself and her primary medium at the Bauhaus. Brandt was one of few women at Bauhaus who distanced herself from the fields considered more feminine at the time such as weaving or pottery.

Brandt refuses the trope of picturing the female body in a state of dressing or undressing. Nor does she express an intention to contemplate the ideal feminine form. Participating in such compositional choices likely would have detracted from her body as a productive force of material objects, including the photograph itself. By the 20th century there was precedence of images of working women situated in industrial environments, but Brandt opts to capture her craft in the metal that provides her reflection. To this end, the metallic surface that reflects Brandt’s portrait resists a “soft” or “sentimental” effect, instead emanating a quiet coolness.

== Tea sets ==
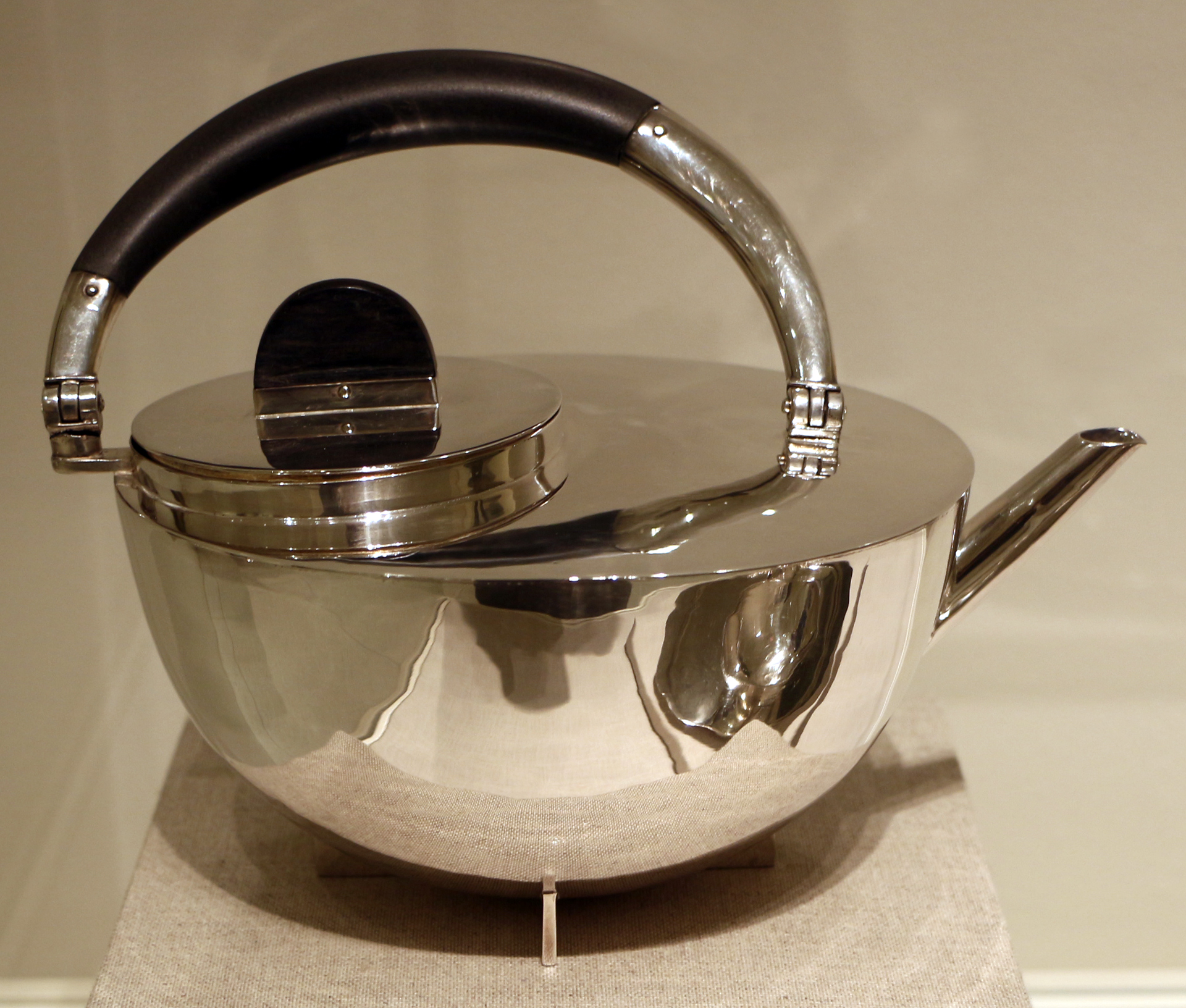
Tea pot, in silver and ebony (1924)

Brandt's tea sets use geometric forms and incorporated ideas from movements such as Constructivism and De Stijl. There is little ornamentation. The sets used material such as silver plate and brass; and ebony for the handles. The tea sets were almost entirely handmade but it led to mass production of similar products. The reproduction rights to Brandt's original 1924 tea set were granted to Alessi, an Italian metalware design company, in 1985. Along with the rights to the tea set, the company also has rights to produce her 1926 ashtray design with removable lid.

Brandt's tea set designs are characteristic of the early phases of modernism. Form predominates over ornament and there is a clear sense of at least symbolic compatibility with modern mass-production technology.

== Quotes ==
In 1970, Brandt said in the Letter to the Younger Generation, “At first, I was not accepted with pleasure—there was no place for a woman in a metal workshop, they felt. They admitted this to me later on and meanwhile expressed their displeasure by giving me all sorts of dull, dreary work. How many little hemispheres did I most patiently hammer out of brittle new silver, thinking that was the way it had to be and all beginnings are hard. Later things settled down, and we got along well together.”

== Exhibitions ==
- Tempo, Tempo! The Bauhaus Photomontages of Marianne Brandt, Elizabeth Otto, a traveling exhibition which was displayed at the Bauhaus Archive, Berlin; Busch-Reisinger Museum at Harvard University, Cambridge, Massachusetts, and the International Center of Photography in New York from 2005 to 2006.

== See also ==
- Women of the Bauhaus

== Bibliography ==
- (in German) Brockhage, Hans and Reinhold Lindner. (2001) Marianne Brandt. Chemnitz: Chemnitzer Verlag
- (in English) Otto, Elizabeth. Tempo, Tempo! The Bauhaus Photomontages of Marianne Brandt. (2005) Berlin: Jovis Verlag
- (in German and English) Otto, Elizabeth (2019) Marianne Brandt in Schierz, Kai Uwe (ed.), et al. 4 "Bauhausmädels": Gertrud Arndt, Marianne Brandt, Margarete Heymann, Margaretha Reichardt, pp. 86–119. Dresden: Sandstein Kommunikation ISBN 978-3954984596
- (in German) Wynhoff, Elisabeth. (2003) Marianne Brandt: Fotografieren am Bauhaus. Hatje Cantz Verlag
