= The Goddess in the Mirror =

2025 book by Tulasi Srinivas

- Cover of the 2025 Duke University Press edition
- Author: Tulasi Srinivas
- Illustrator: Richa Bhavanam (photographer)
- Language: English
- Genre: Anthropology
- Published: November 2025
- Publisher: Duke University Press
- Pages: 296
- ISBN: 978-1-4780-3277-9 paperback
- OCLC: 1509185382

The Goddess in the Mirror: An Anthropology of Beauty is a 2025 anthropology book by Tulasi Srinivas. An ethnographic study of Indian beauty parlors in Bengaluru, it centres on the attributes of the Hindu goddess sought after by the city's women. The book originated from fieldwork done with beauticians in the city, with some conducted remotely through WhatsApp amidst the COVID-19 pandemic, and was completed for the Harvard Divinity School Women’s Study in Religion Program. It received praise for its ambition, themes, and value, but faced criticism for its focus issues and condensation of topics.

== Contents ==
The Goddess in the Mirror: An Anthropology of Beauty is an ethnographic study of Indian beauty parlors in Bengaluru, (Note: Srinivas uses the old name of Bangalore since the 2014 name change had not occurred at the time of fieldwork.) conducted through a lens of religion, politics, and gender. In addition to an introduction, conclusion and postlude, There are six chapters in the book, each named after an attribute of the Hindu goddess sought after by Bangalore's women. Shekhawat cited her academic background in ethics and religious anthropology as an influence in the work.

The multi-chapter section starts by studying Indian beauty history through the microhistory of the local Bengaluru Miss Vegetarian Pageant in "Alluring". The role of beauty in colourism is explored in "Radiant", including by exploring through the lens of the story of Draupadi, and the nature of heat as a sensual reaction is explored in "Hot". Afterwards is "Nightmare", an interlude part on the story of one of the Northeast migrant beauticians at the Lotus salon and spa, which later continues in "Wounded" as an exploration of the political economy of beauty, including by exploring the layers of India's "regimes of citizenship" in regards to labor migration. The penultimate chapter "Fortunate" centres on beauty in Hindu weddings, and the final chapter "Fluid" explores the LGBTQ+ side of Bengaluru's beauty industry.

Shekhawat noted that The Goddess in the Mirror explores diversity by covering several castes and LGBTQ+ communities, in contrast to heteronormative approaches towards beauty, and characterized her academic approach in the book as feminist. Hawley remarks that Srinivas' argument is that the Hindu goddesses manifest through the smṛti domain within the beauty parlors, while Shekhawat argues that the book revisions beauty as a "social project" rooted in South Asian cosmology and the good and evil dichotomy.

The Goddess in the Mirror has 296 pages and 32 illustrations. Hawley says that the titular Goddess of the book, referring to the woman seen in the cover, may be Mariamman because she is "so out of focus when she greets us" in addition to being in contrast of the aforementioned fact.

== Production and release ==
In the 2000s, Srinivas started doing fieldwork on beauticians based in Bengaluru, conducting several interviews in the process. Although her work was in-person, she frequently used WhatsApp to communicate with beauticians after the COVID-19 pandemic. Srinivas remarked that she was "literally in two worlds" doing research for the book:

I spent half the Boston night virtually in Bangalore, listening to the koels singing and crows cawing and hearing the blow dryers in the parlors and the election megaphones in the streets as I spoke with beauty workers ... At the other end, I was wading through this river of data mostly at night when they were at work, and my days in Boston became exhausted stumbles through work and life.

Completed at the Harvard Divinity School Carriage House for the institution's Women's Study in Religion Program, The Goddess in the Mirror was released in November 2025. It was the second of a "trilogy" of books Srinivas wrote on Bengaluru (her native city), with the first being The Cow in the Elevator. Richa Bhavanam took several photographs for the book while Srinivas remained in the United States.

== Reception ==
John Stratton Hawley said of The Goddess in the Mirror: "This is a book that makes you ask about every step of life, every urge of self-fashioning. Tulasi Srinivas lets you think it might be divine after all. In a world where so many of us have lost hope, she hangs on precisely to that." Gunjan Shekhawat called it "a valuable and nuanced book that will resonate with scholars of gender and labour, urban anthropology, South Asian studies, and anyone interested in how everyday practices become sites of political struggle. In terms of disciplinary impact, The Goddess in the Mirror may well become a touchstone for integrating aesthetic and affective dimensions into analyses of power."

Hawley praised Srinivas' English-language writing as "amazing", but criticized the images for diverging from the topic of each chapter; he also remarked that the ghaṭam pots were not explored in the book, comparing this to Big Brother and Naman Ahuja. Similarly, Shekhawat criticized the lack of context provided for topics like specific Hindu myths and Sanskrit aesthetics, and felt that there was lack of depth for certain topics due to the book's effort to "combine mythology, economics, sensory ethnography, and political critique all in one volume".
