= Nicole Eustace =

American historian

Nicole Eustace is an American historian who won the 2022 Pulitzer Prize for History, for Covered with Night: A Story of Murder and Indigenous Justice in Early America and was a finalist for the 2021 National Book Award for Nonfiction.

She graduated from the University of Pennsylvania. She is a professor at New York University. Eustace was awarded a Guggenheim Fellowship in 2025.

== Works ==
- Passion is the Gale: Emotion, Power, and the Coming of the American Revolution, University of North Carolina Press, 2008. ISBN 9780807831687
- 1812: War and the Passions of Patriotism, University of Pennsylvania Press, May 2012. ISBN 9780812223484
- ed. with Fredrika J. Teute, Warring for America: Cultural Contests in the Era of 1812, UNC Press, 2017. ISBN 9781469631516
- Covered with Night: A Story of Murder and Indigenous Justice in Early America, W. W. North & Company, 2021.ISBN 9781631495878
