= Peter S. Shin =

American composer (born 1991)

- Born: Peter Seajong Shin; October 15, 1991 (age 34); Kansas City, Missouri, U.S.
- Education: University of Michigan; University of Southern California; Yale School of Music; University of California, Berkeley
- Occupation: Composer
- Awards: Guggenheim Fellowship (2025); Princeton University Hodder Fellowship (2025); American Academy of Arts and Letters Charles Ives Fellowship (2023); American Academy of Arts and Letters Charles Ives Scholarship (2018)
- Website: www.peter-shin.com

Peter Seajong Shin (신세종), known professionally as Peter S. Shin, is an American composer.

His 8-part vocal work, Bits torn from words, written for Roomful of Teeth was one of four premiere recordings on the GRAMMY Award-winning album, Rough Magic. His music includes Korean and American themes.

His honors include a Guggenheim Fellowship (2025), Hodder Fellowship from Princeton University (2025), both the American Academy of Arts and Letters Charles Ives Scholarship (2018) and Charles Ives Fellowship (2023), Harvard University Fromm Foundation commission (2019), MacDowell Fellowship (2025), and a Serge Koussevitzky Music Foundation in the Library of Congress commission (2026).

== Reception ==
In a review for The New York Times, chief classical music critic Anthony Tommasini wrote about the premiere of Shin’s orchestral work Slant, performed by the New York Youth Symphony in 2018. Tommasini described the piece as “gripping music that boldly shifts from pointillist bursts to whooshing sound effects to eerie passages of wafting string lines,” adding that Shin “manages to pull off something very difficult: evoking a past master’s distinctive voice while sounding entirely fresh and personal.” He concluded, “Mr. Shin is a composer to watch.”

Commissioned by John Adams for the 2018 Cabrillo Festival of Contemporary Music, Hypercolor drew critical attention from the San Francisco Classical Voice, which wrote that “Shin is a master of bizarre instrumental sounds,” citing the work's “creaks, groans, whistles, squiggles, squeals, and squeaks” that often “abruptly and humorously” died away.
