= Oman Air =

National airline of Oman

Oman Air الطيران العماني

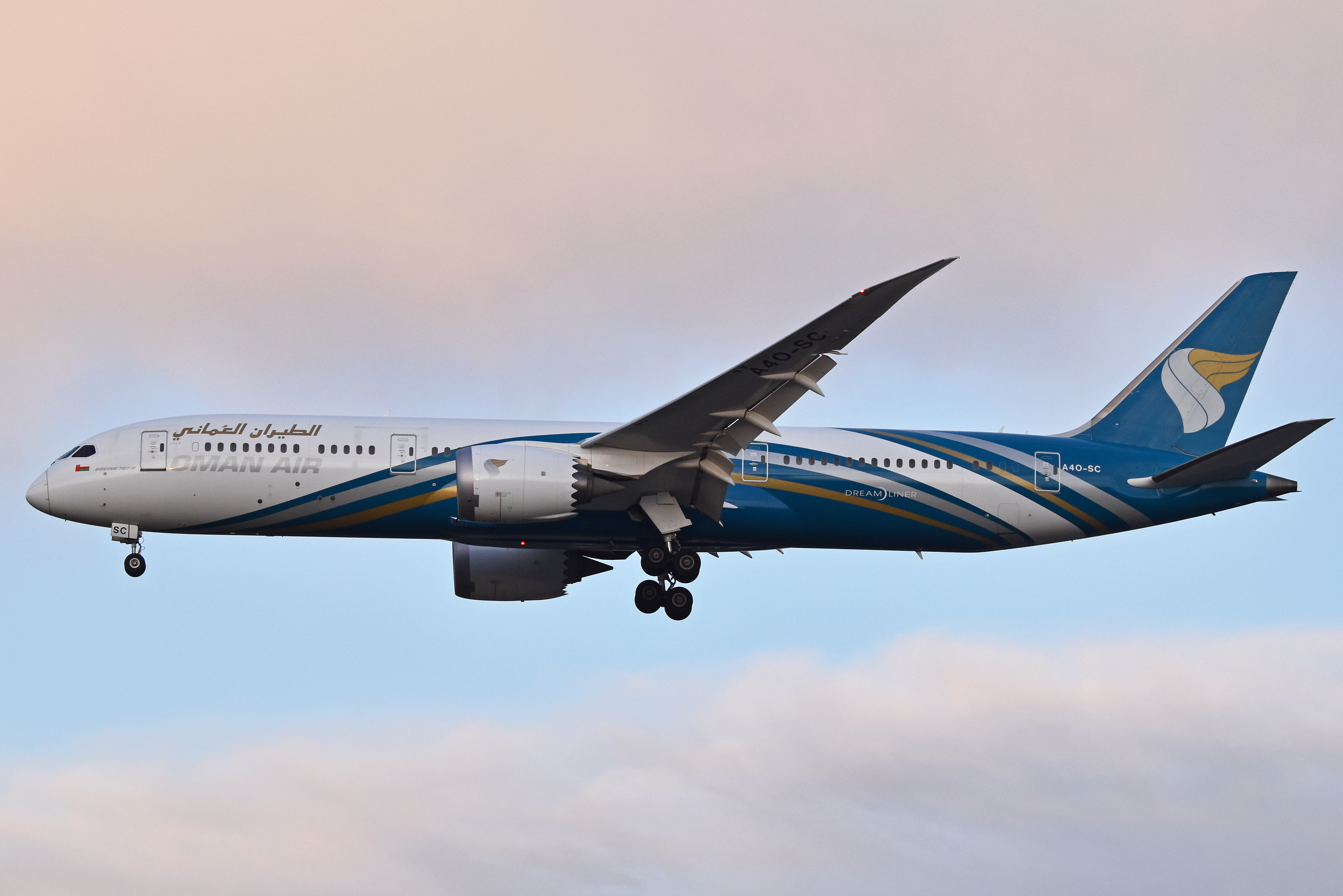
- Oman Air Boeing 787-9
| IATA | ICAO | Call sign |
|---|---|---|
| WY | OMA | OMAN AIR |
- Founded: 1949; 77 years ago (as Gulf Aviation)
- Commenced operations: March 1993; 33 years ago (as Oman Air)
- Hubs: Muscat International Airport
- Frequent-flyer program: Sindbad
- Alliance: Oneworld
- Fleet size: 33
- Destinations: 43
- Parent company: Oman Investment Authority
- Headquarters: Muscat International Airport, Seeb, Oman
- Key people: Saeed Bin Hamoud Al-Mawali (chairman); Nasser Al-Sharji (CEO)
- Website: www.omanair.com

Oman Air (Arabic: الطيران العماني, romanized: at-Ṭayarāan al-ʻUmānī) is the flag carrier of Oman. Based at Muscat International Airport in Muscat, it operates domestic and international passenger services, as well as regional air taxi and charter flights.

== History ==
=== Background ===
Oman was one of the four shareholders of Gulf Air, alongside the UAE, Qatar, and Bahrain. It was also the last nation to exit from the carrier, leaving in 2007.

Oman Aviation Services Company S.A.O.
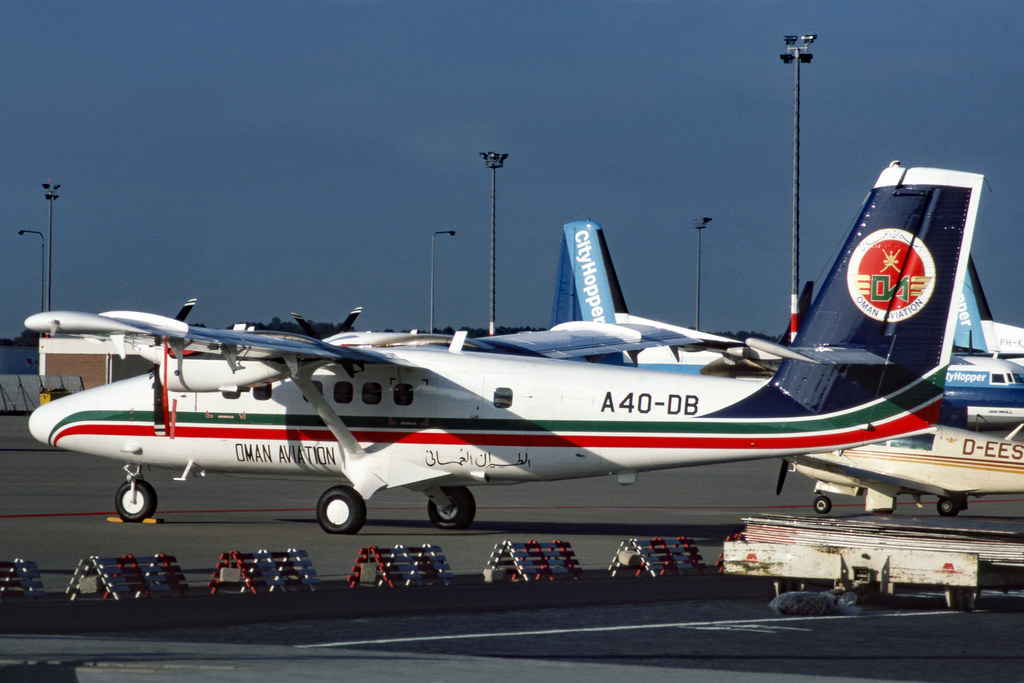
- A De Havilland Canada DHC-6
| IATA | ICAO | Call sign |
|---|---|---|
| WY | OAS | ORYX |
- Founded: 1981
- Ceased operations: 1993
- Hubs: Muscat
- Focus cities: Salalah; Khasab; Sur
- Fleet size: 27
- Destinations: 17
- Parent company: Oman Aviation Services S.A.O.
- Headquarters: Muscat, Oman
- Website: oman-aviation.com (defunct)

Oman Air traces its roots back to 1970 when Oman International Services (OIS) was established. The company became a civil aircraft ground handling provider at Beit Al Falaj Airport. In 1973, OIS moved its operations to the new terminal at Seeb International Airport. The company took over Gulf Air's Light Aircraft Division in 1977, before establishing its Aircraft Engineering Division in the same year. Oman's rapidly expanding civil aviation industry led OIS to build several facilities – including hangars, workshops and in-flight catering – to cater to the increase in activity.

In 1981, Oman Aviation Services became a joint-stock company. OAS also purchased 13 aircraft from Gulf Air, allowing the company to replace its turboprop Fokker F27-600 with the −500 series. The following year, Oman Aviation Services jointly commenced jet services, along with Gulf Air, to Salalah. From 1983 to 1993, the company purchased new equipment, including the Cessna Citation, De Havilland Canada DHC-6 Twin Otter and new facilities to help it improve its services.

=== Foundation ===
In 1993, Oman Air was founded. The airline's inaugural flight took place in March 1993, when a leased Boeing 737-300 from Ansett Worldwide Aviation Services (AWAS) flew from Muscat to Salalah. In July of the same year, the airline's first international flight was operated to Dubai, also utilising a Boeing 737-300. Flights to other destinations quickly followed, with Trivandrum (Thiruvananthapuram) services starting in November, Kuwait and Karachi in January 1994, and Colombo in October 1994. In 1995, two Airbus A320s were wet-leased from Region Air of Singapore to replace the 737s. From 1995 to 1997, new services were introduced to Mumbai, Dhaka, Abu Dhabi, Doha and Chennai. In October 1998, Oman Air became a member of the international aviation industry trade group International Air Transport Association (IATA). By the end of the following year, Gwadar, Peshawar, Jeddah and Al Ain were included in the airline's expanding route network, although the former two, along with a host of other destinations, were discontinued in 2000.

=== Recapitalization ===
In March 2007, the Omani government recapitalised the airline, which saw the government increasing its shareholding from approximately 33 to 80 percent. It was also announced that Oman Air would be re-evaluating its strategic plans, with a possibility of entering the long-haul market. This culminated in May 2007 when Oman withdrew from Gulf Air to focus on the development of its national flag carrier, leaving Bahrain as the sole owner of the airline. Oman Air commenced long-haul services on 26 November 2007 by launching flights to Bangkok and London.

On 2 April 2007, Oman Air announced it had placed a firm order with Airbus for 5 Airbus A330 aircraft, with delivery scheduled for 2009. At the 2009 Dubai Air Show, Oman Air finalized the order, which involved 3 A330-300s and 2 A330-200s. Deliveries started during the third quarter of 2009. In February 2009, Oman Air announced intentions to lease another 2 A330-200s from Jet Airways. During the 2009 Dubai Air Show, Oman Air also finalised an order for five Embraer E175 aircraft with another 5 options, which the airline received from 2011.

In March 2010, Oman Air became the first airline in the world to offer both mobile phone and Wi-Fi connectivity on selected routes.

=== Developments since 2010 ===
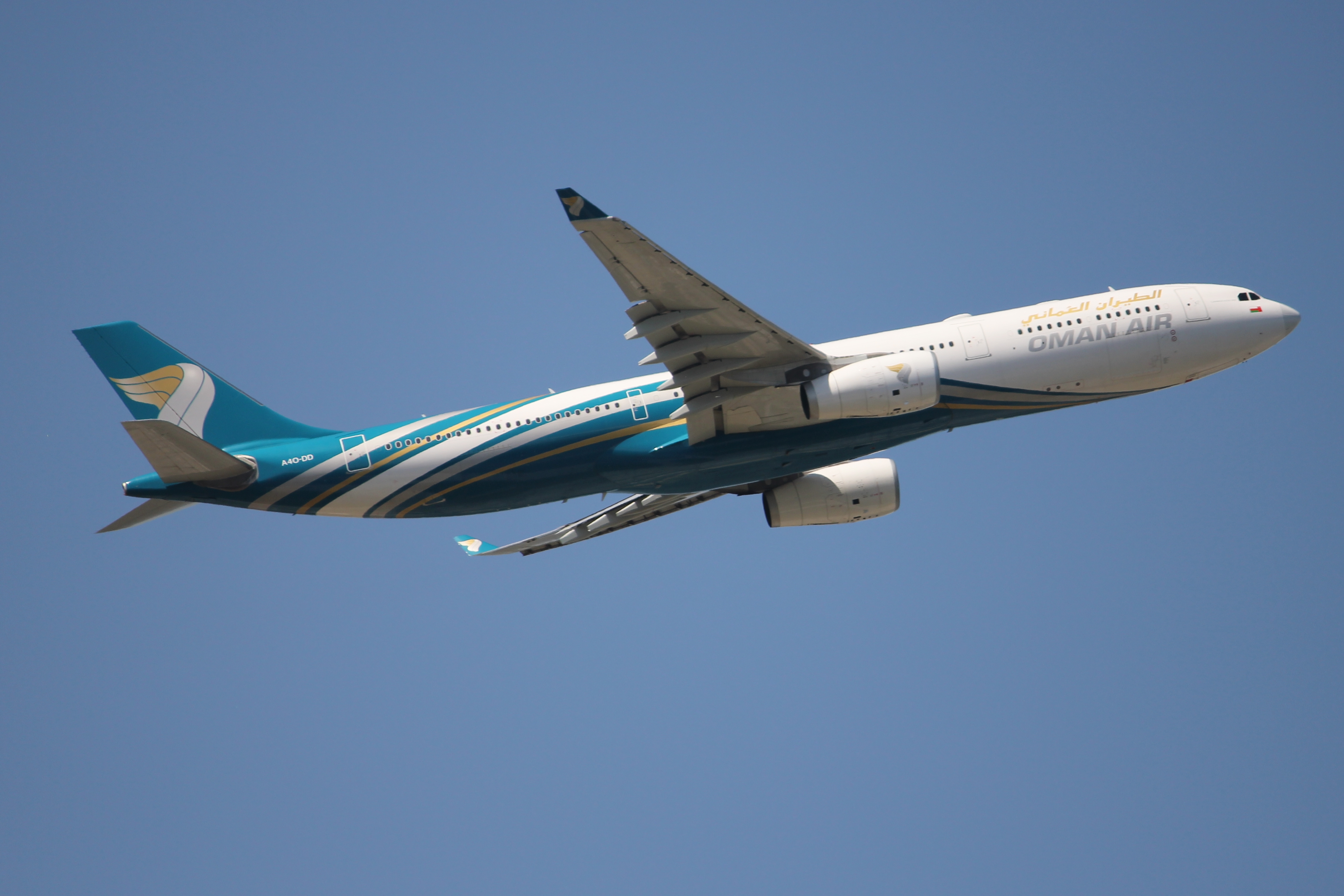
An Airbus A330-300, a type which was phased out due to restructuring measures in 2024

By November 2010, the Omani government held a 99.8 percent stake in the airline. In 2010, Maitha Al Mahrouqi was appointed Country Manager. In 2011, Oman Air won the Gold award for the "Airline of the Year" at France's Laurier d'Or du Voyage d'Affaires.

In September 2013, the CEO stated that Oman Air was planning to have a 50 aircraft strong fleet by 2017. In April 2015, Oman Air announced it would phase out its smaller aircraft to focus on an all Airbus and Boeing fleet. Two ATR 42-500 aircraft were withdrawn by the end of 2015, while the four Embraer E175 and the Boeing 737-700 aircraft were both retired by the end of 2016. In April 2017, Oman Air announced plans to replace its A330s with Airbus A350s or Boeing 787s. In July 2017, Oman Air received the award for "Best Airline Staff Service in the Middle East" at the Skytrax World Airline Awards. In addition, the Seven Stars Luxury Lifestyle and Hospitality Awards named Oman Air the "Best Airline in Europe, the Middle East, and Africa" for the second year in a row. In October 2018, the CEO of Oman Air, Abdulaziz bin Saud al Raisi, announced that the airline was aiming to add over 60 new destinations and 70 new aircraft by 2022.

In June 2019, the International Air Transport Association (IATA) granted the level 4 New Distribution Capability (NDC) certification to the airline. The carrier became one of the first airlines to function on the latest standards, adding the title to its existing level 3 NDC certification. Oman Air and Kenya Airways announced the expansion of their codeshare cooperation, which was first signed in August 2017. The expansion, effective since 1 October 2019, increased destinations for their flyers, where they were allowed to seamlessly travel beyond Nairobi to Entebbe in Uganda and Johannesburg in South Africa.

In February 2021, Oman Air announced it would abandon fleet expansion plans due to lower demand as COVID-19 emerged. Chairman Mohammed Al-Barwani announced a reduction of aircraft from 50 to 36 aircraft. Additionally, a few non-profitable routes, including Athens and Casablanca, were terminated. In September 2021, Oman Air announced its intentions to join the Oneworld alliance by the end of 2022. This was followed by an announcement in June 2022 that Oman Air would join the alliance in 2024.

In August 2023, Oman Air announced a new program to restructure the airline after an assessment was conducted of the airline's commercial and financial performance. Saeed Al Mawali, chairman of the airline, stated that the program would focus on four areas; financial sustainability, corporate governance, commercial aspects, and human capital. He added that a qualified team would be required to implement the program over 2–3 years.

In February 2024, Oman Air announced it would retire its fleet of 10 Airbus A330 aircraft by March 2024 as well as cease operations on four routes and downsize operations on several others as part of ongoing restructuring efforts. In November, following rolling delays, Oman Air joined the Oneworld alliance on 30 June 2025.

In October 2025, Oman Air removed the name "Israel" from its flight maps and replaced it with "State of Palestine."

On 2 July 2026, Oman Air resumed services to Singapore after a nine-year absence, launching a non-stop route between Muscat and Singapore. The approximately eight-hour service operates four times weekly using a Boeing 737 MAX.

== Corporate affairs ==
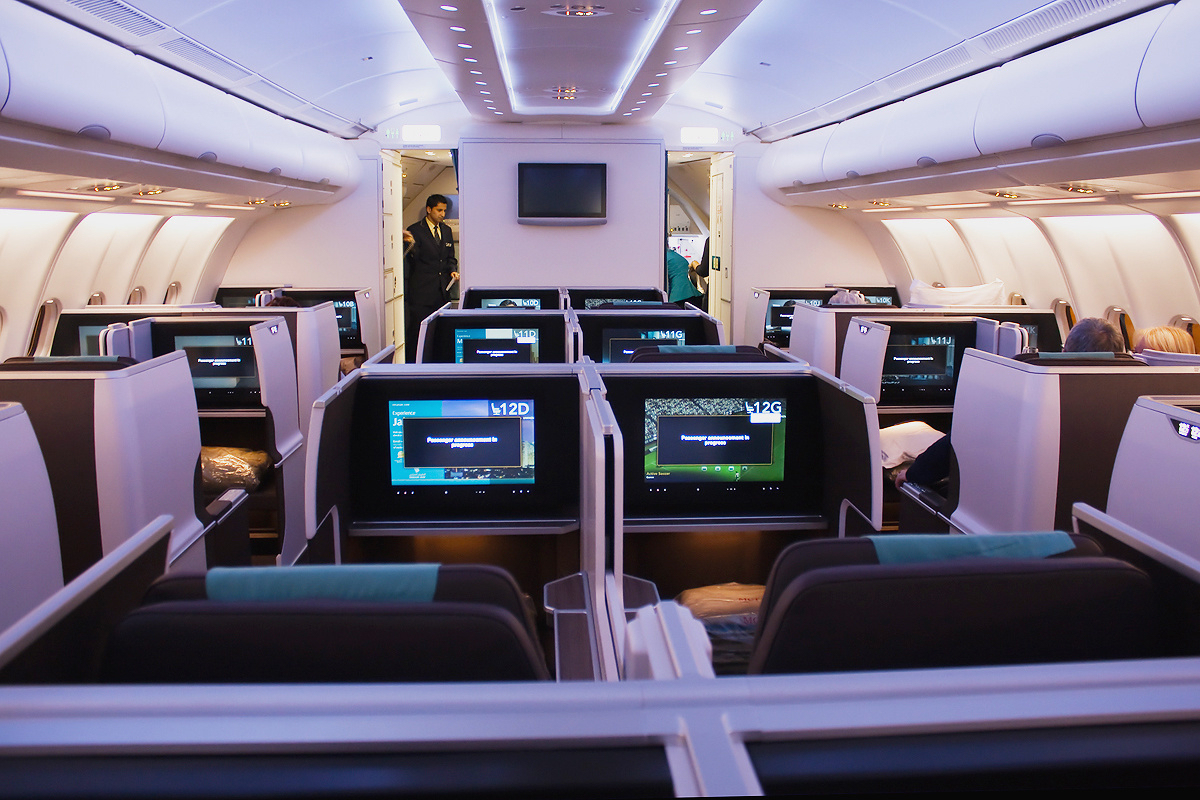
The variant of the business class cabin on an Airbus A330-300

=== Frequent flyer program ===
Sindbad is Oman Air's frequent flyer program, launched in 2006. It is a three-tier frequent flyer program; the three tiers are Sindbad Blue, Sindbad Silver and Sindbad Gold. Sindbad also has a partnership agreement with the respective program of Etihad Airways and miles can be earned through several Sindbad partners.

=== Sponsorships ===
- Oman Air became the Presenting Sponsor for the 2015 NBO Golf Classic Grand Final.
- In July 2023, Oman Air became the global airline partner for Chelsea FC. The partnership was slated to run until 2026. However, in March 2024, reports highlighted that the partnership may have been terminated, although neither organization confirmed this change.

=== Livery ===
The original livery features a white fuselage with red and green cheatlines, with the airline's English and Arabic names written in red and green, respectively. Oman's national symbol, the Khanjar, is painted in red on the vertical stabilizer. In the late 1990s, the livery was revised, with the cheat lines removed but the corporate red-green palette kept. A new red vertical stabilizer was introduced, with the khanjar repainted in white and a green stripe painted on the rear fuselage. For aircraft with wingtips, the logo was added on them with a solid red background. The current livery also features a white fuselage, but the vertical stabilizer changed to blue, and an incense smoke replacing the khanjar as the official logo. Oman Air's names in Arabic and English are now painted in gold and silver, respectively.

== Destinations ==
As of August 2026, Oman Air operates a network of 43 destinations in 25 countries out of its hub at Muscat and the airlines flies to destinations across the Middle East, Asia, Europe, and Africa. The country that sees the most services is India with 6 destinations.

=== Codeshare agreements ===
Oman Air has codeshare agreements with the following airlines:

- Bangkok Airways
- Egyptair
- Ethiopian Airlines
- Etihad Airways
- Finnair
- Garuda Indonesia
- Gulf Air
- Kenya Airways
- KLM
- Kuwait Airways
- Lufthansa
- Malaysia Airlines
- Qantas
- Qatar Airways
- Royal Jordanian
- SalamAir
- Saudia
- SriLankan Airlines
- Swiss International Air Lines
- Thai Airways International
- Turkish Airlines

=== Interline agreements ===
Oman Air has interline agreements with the following airlines:

- My Freighter Airlines

== Fleet ==
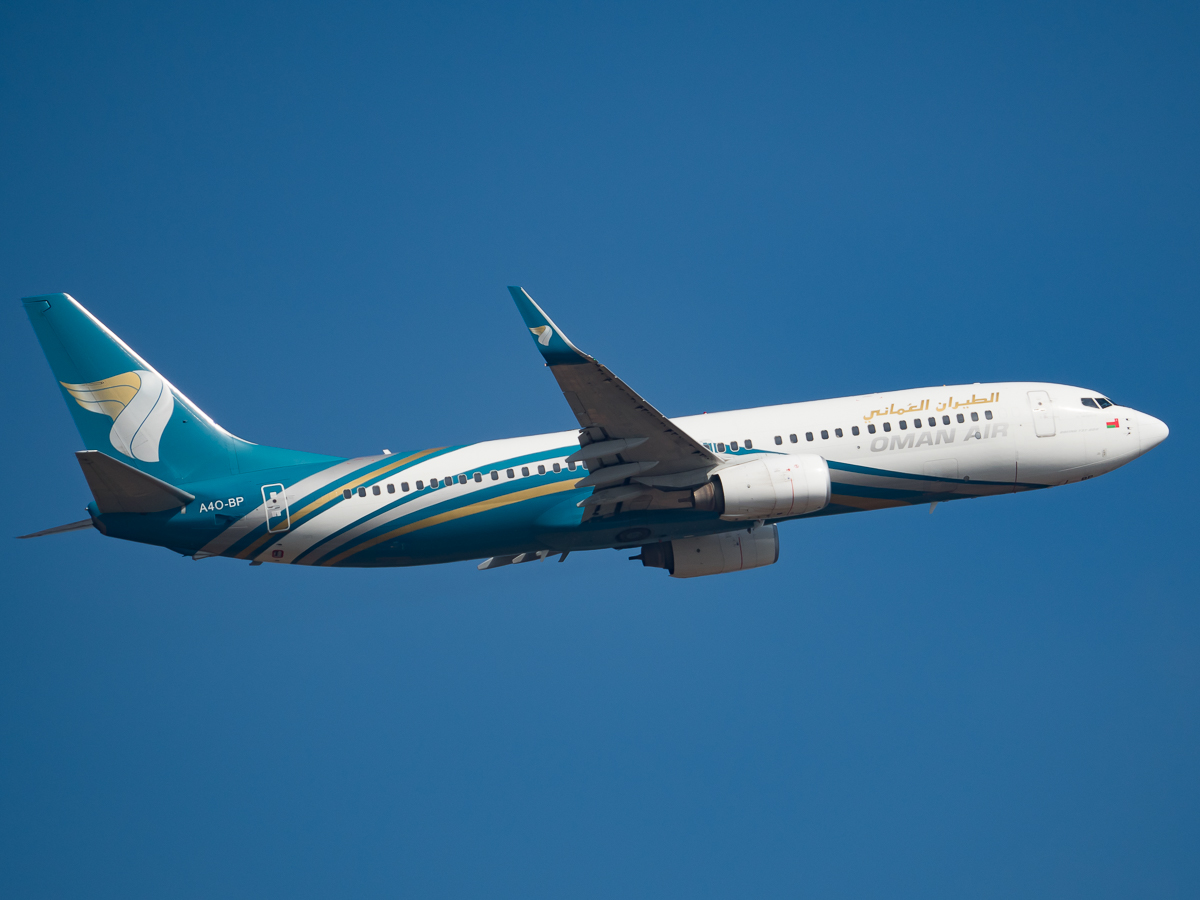
Boeing 737-800

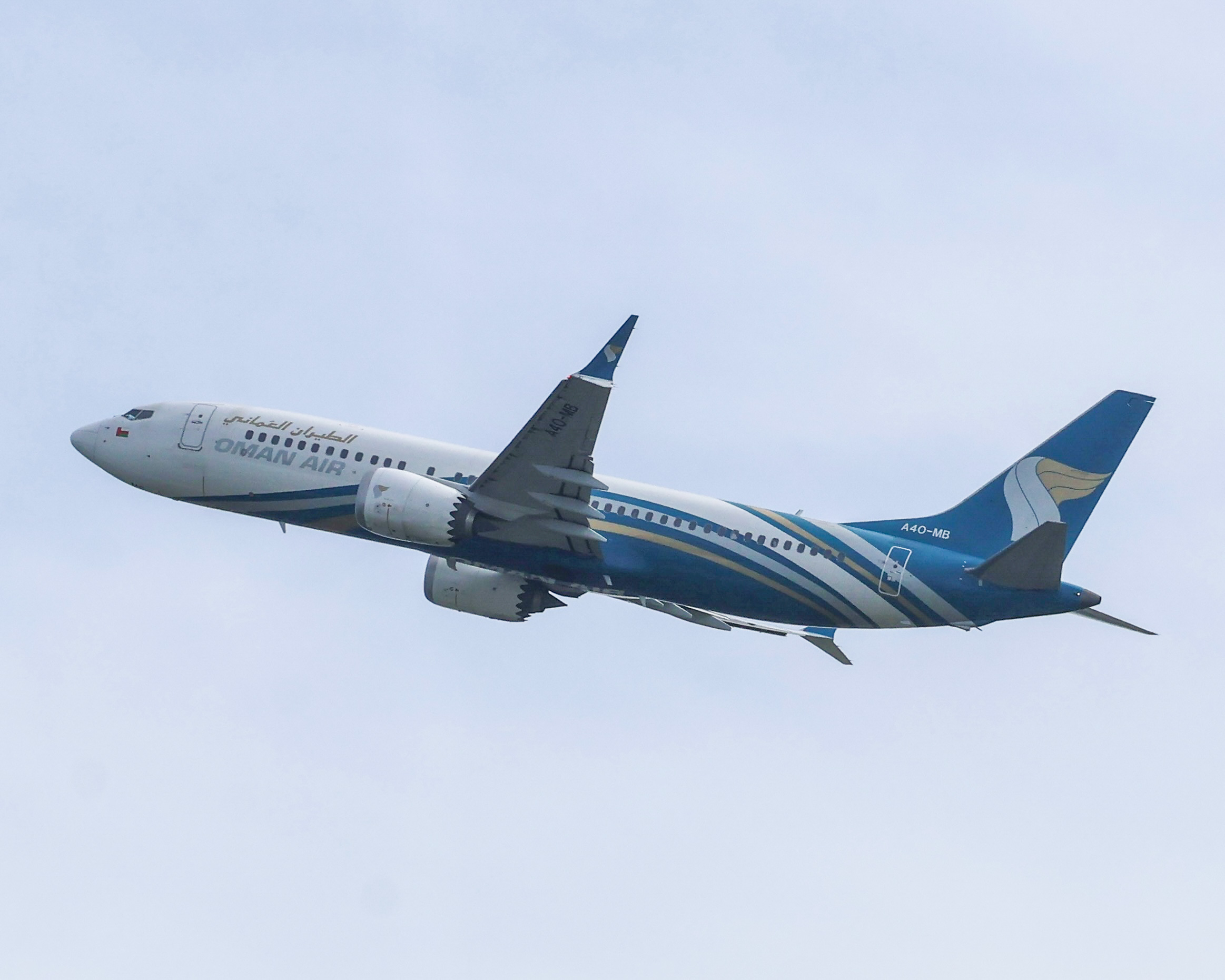
Boeing 737 MAX 8

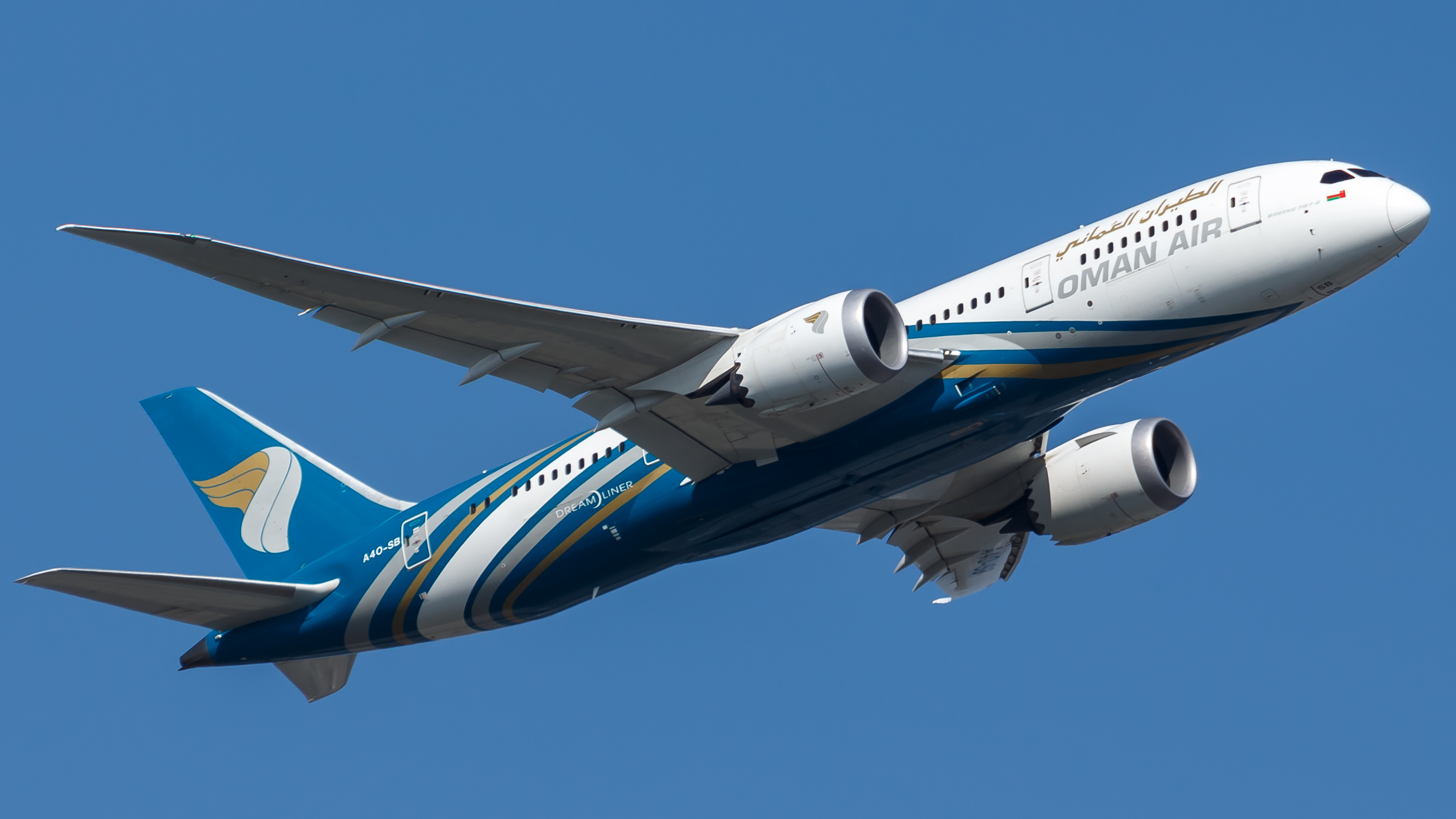
Boeing 787-8

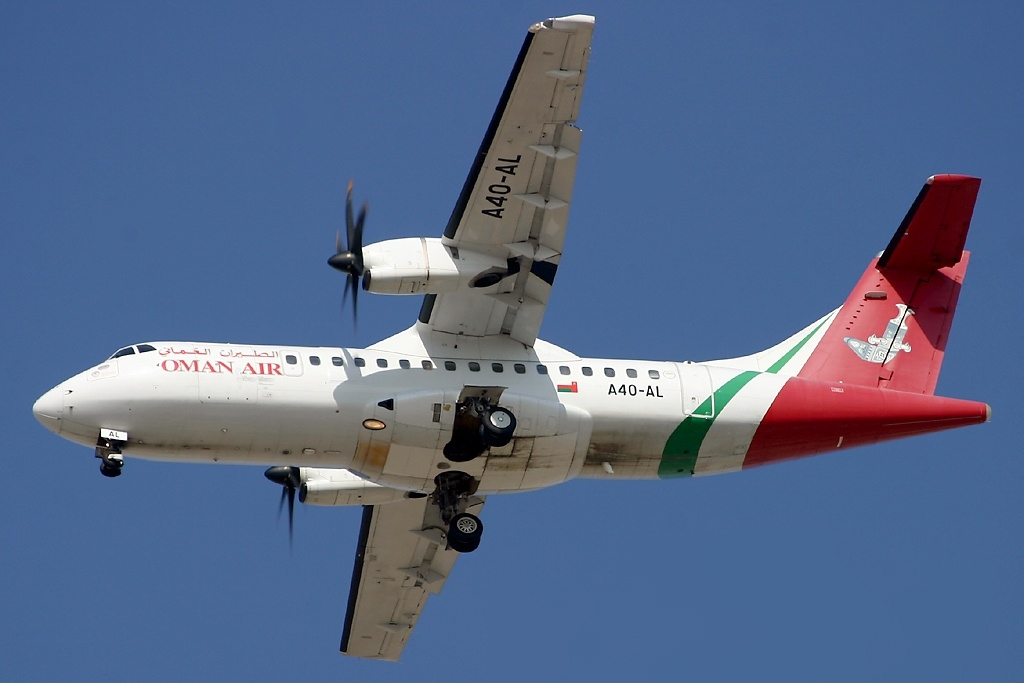
ATR 42-500

As of November 2025, Oman Air operates an all-Boeing fleet composed of the following aircraft:

Oman Air fleet
| Aircraft | In service | Orders | Passengers | | | | Notes |
| Aircraft | In service | Orders | F | J | Y | Total | Notes |
|---|---|---|---|---|---|---|---|
| Boeing 737-900ER | 2 | — | — | 12 | 171 | 183 | To be retired by late 2026 and transferred to Sun Country Airlines. |
| Boeing 737 MAX 8 | 13 | — | — | 12 | 150 | 162 | |
| Boeing 737 MAX 8 | 5 | — | — | — | 189 | 189 | Equipped with an all-economy class configuration and branded as 'Oman Air Connect'. |
| Boeing 787-9 | 10 | 6 | 8 | 24 | 232 | 264 | |
| Boeing 787-9 | 10 | 6 | — | 30 | 258 | 288 | One leased to Riyadh Air. |
| Total | 33 | 7 | | | | | |

== Accidents and incidents ==
Oman Air has never had a fatal crash, only serious incidents such as runway excursions and turbulence are mentioned here.

| Date | Location | Aircraft | Registration | Aircraft Damage | Total on board | Casualties or Fatalities | Description | Notes |
|---|---|---|---|---|---|---|---|---|
| 5 December 1991 | Khasab Airport | De Havilland Canada DHC-6 Twin Otter | A4O-DB | SUB | 19 | 0 | Several were injured when an Oman Aviation Services DHC-6 hard-landed, causing the nose gear to collapse and the aircraft to veer off the runway. | |
| 27 May 1995 | Muscat-Seeb Airport | Fokker F27 Friendship-500RF | A4O-FE | SUB | 46 | 0 | The aircraft landed without the nose wheel, the aircraft's nose wheel caught fire. The aircraft veered off the runway, it was repaired. | |
| 15 December 2010 | Salalah International Airport | Boeing 737-81M (WL) | A4O-BE | SUB | 124 | 0 | The nose gear veered off the runway, both nose gear tires were out of limit causing the nose gear tires to deflate. FOD came to the plane due to the debris. Serving as WY905. | |
| 19 May 2019 | Muscat International Airport | Boeing 737-81M (WL) | A4O-BW | SUB | 0 | 0 | The standing aircraft was pushed by a hailstorm, both engines detached, the winglet hit an object, and almost hit another Oman Air Boeing 737-800 | |
| 31 May 2025 | Muscat International Airport | Boeing 737 MAX 8 | A4O-ML | SUB | 152 | 0 | Shortly after takeoff, the aircraft experienced Low pressure engine (ENG) No.1 hydraulic PUMP light, they decided to return to Muscat and avoid overweight landing, when the aircraft landed, number 1 tire failed and there was damage to the hydraulic pipes, Oman Airports Operations reported that FOD came all over the runway, the FOD was later identified as coming from Oman Air Flight OMA15, the aircraft veered off the runway, due to the damage of the aircraft, the aircraft was disabled and needed to be towed back. | |
