= Maitha Al Mahrouqi =

Omani businesswoman and politician

- ميثاء المحروقية
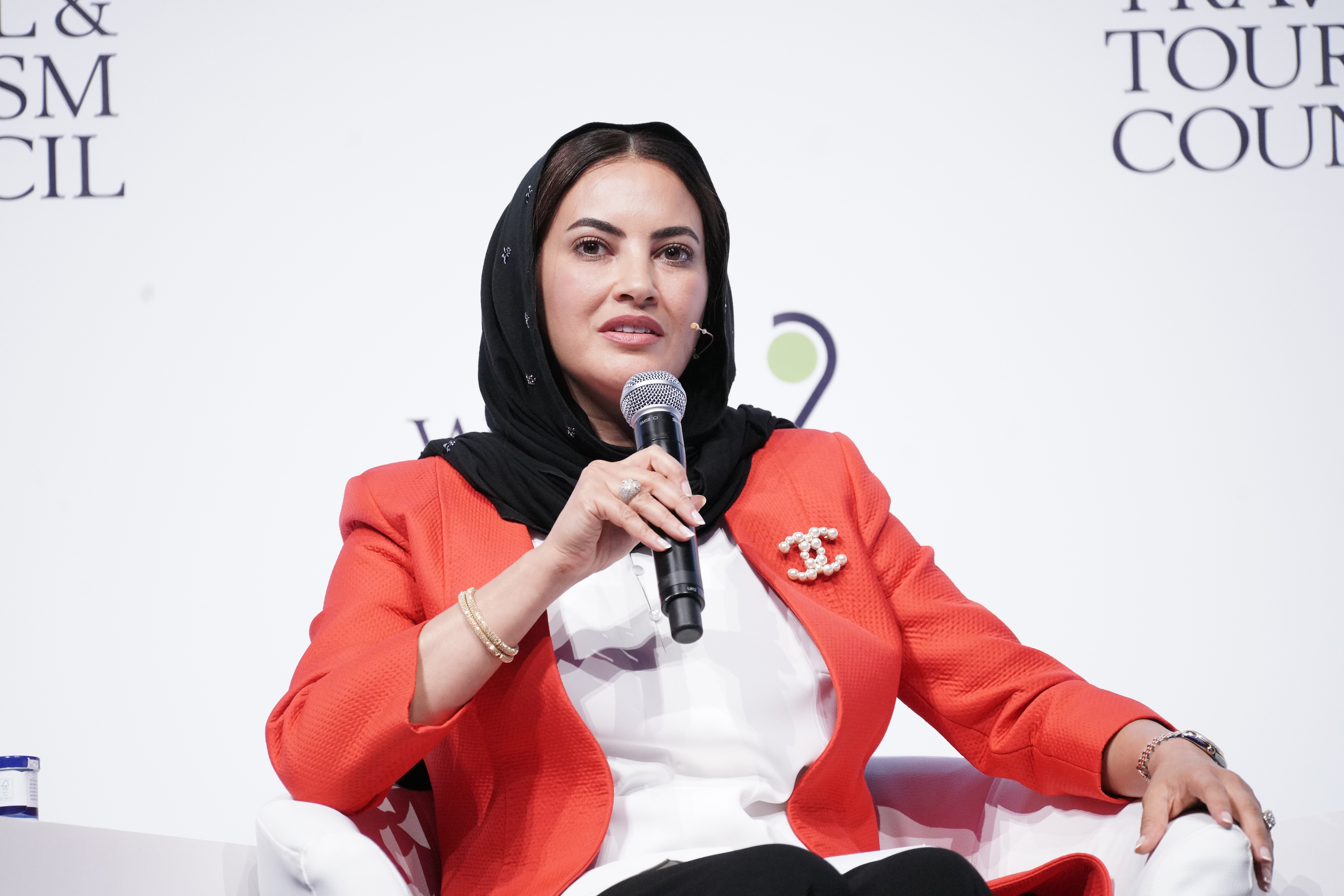
- Al Mahrouqi in 2019

Omani Ambassador to Germany
- Incumbent
- Assumed office 2 October 2022

Personal details
- Education: Oxford Brookes University; University of Hull

Her Excellency Maitha Saif Majid Al Mahrouqi (Arabic: ميثاء بنت سيف المحروقية) is an Omani businesswoman and politician who is the Oman's Ambassador to Germany. She also served as the Undersecretary for Tourism in Oman between 2011 and 2020.

== Biography ==
Al Mahrouqi studied at Oxford Brookes University. In 1999, she was the first woman from the Gulf to region to gain a BSc in Cartography, this was awarded by the UK Board of Cartography. She also earned an MA in marketing from the University of Hull. She is fluent in English and Arabic.

Al Mahrouqi's career began in the aviation sector, in which she worked for the airline Emirates, as well as Gulf Air in Bahrain. In 2010, she was appointed Country Manager for Oman Air. In 2011, she was appointed as the Undersecretary for the Ministry of Tourism (MoT) for the Government of Oman. During her appointment, the MoT commissioned the development of a long-term vision for tourism to Oman. In 2016, Al Mahrouqi led the Omani delegation to the Gulf Cooperation Council (GCC) Tourism Summit in Saudi Arabia. She was also the vice-chair for the National Aviation Group of Oman's board of directors.

In 2015, Al Mahrouqi was awarded the Oman Civil Order (3rd Class) by Sultan Qaboos bin Said. In 2016, Al Mahrouqi was awarded the Golden Shield of Excellence for the Tourism Sector from the Arab Women's Council.

On October 2, 2022, she was appointed as the Omani Ambassador to Germany, presenting her credentials to Frank-Walter Steinmeier. Additionally, she serves as the non-resident Omani Ambassador to Denmark, Finland, Iceland, Norway, Poland, Sweden, and Ukraine.
