= Tulasi Srinivas =

Indian academic

- Occupations: Religious studies scholar; anthropologist
- Father: M. N. Srinivas
- Awards: Guggenheim Fellowship (2025)

Academic background
- Education: Bangalore University; University of Southern California; Boston University
- Thesis: 'Divine enterprise': An ethnographic study of popular Hinduism (2001)
- Doctoral advisor: Peter L. Berger

Academic work
- Discipline: Religious studies; anthropology
- Institutions: Emerson College

Tulasi Srinivas is an Indian religious studies scholar and anthropologist. She was a 2025 Guggenheim Fellow. Her work includes Winged Faith (2010) and The Goddess in the Mirror (2024). She is Professor of Anthropology, Religion and Transnational Studies at the Emerson College Marlboro Institute for Interdisciplinary Studies.

== Biography ==
Srinivas was born to M. N. Srinivas, a sociologist, and Rukmini Srinivas, a geography professor and cookbook writer. A native of Bangalore, she obtained a BA in architecture from Bangalore University and an MA in urban studies from the University of Southern California. She obtained a PhD in religious studies and anthropology from Boston University's University Professors Program; her doctoral dissertation ‘Divine enterprise’: An ethnographic study of popular Hinduism was supervised by Peter L. Berger.

Srinivas originally taught at Wheaton College and the Berkley Center for Religion, Peace, and World Affairs, before she started working at Emerson College, where she eventually became a full professor. She won Emerson's 2015 Helaine and Stanley Miller Award for teaching excellence.

Srinivas specializes in religious studies, with her work centering on comparative ethics, Hinduism, and the anthropology of several aesthetical aspects like beauty and wonder. She has written several books, including Winged Faith (2010), Curried Cultures (2012), The Cow in the Elevator (2018), Wonder in South Asia (2023), and The Goddess in the Mirror (2024). She is currently working on an upcoming book called The Runaway Goddess: Water and Women in a Millennial City. In addition to books, she has written a few dozen book chapters and articles. In 2025, she was awarded a Guggenheim Fellowship in Religion. She is also a fellow of the Indian Sociological Society and the Royal Asiatic Society of Great Britain and Ireland.

Srinivas has written articles for The Conversation and The Wire, and she has frequently appeared as an expert on NPR and NBC News. In April 2011, she provided an obituary of the mystic Sathya Sai Baba to The American Magazine. She has criticized the Michelin Guide as "Eurocentric and elitist", citing a lack of representation of African and Indian restaurants. She has also worked as an advisor to climate justice non-profit Bhumi and as an expert in global inequality and faith for the World Economic Forum.

Srinivas lives in Arlington, Massachusetts. Her sister Lakshmi is a sociologist who works at UM Boston.

== Works ==
- Winged Faith: Rethinking Globalization and Religious Pluralism (2010) (Note: Reviews of this book:)
- Curried Cultures: Food, Globalization and South Asia (2012)
- The Cow in the Elevator: An Anthropology of Wonder (2018) (Note: Reviews of this book:)
- Wonder in South Asia: Politics, Aesthetics, Ethics (2023)
- The Goddess in the Mirror: An Anthropology of Beauty (2024)
- The Runaway Goddess: Water and Women in a Millennial City (TBA)
