= Miranda Lichtenstein =

American photographer (born 1969)

Miranda Lichtenstein (born December 11, 1969) is an American artist focusing on photography and video.

== Life ==
Lichtenstein was born in New York City and currently lives and works in Brooklyn, New York. In 1990, Lichtenstein graduated with a BA from Sarah Lawrence College in Bronxville, NY. In 1993 she earned her MFA from California Institute of the Arts, Valencia, CA.

== Work ==
For nearly two decades, Lichtenstein has worked in varied sub-genres within photography’s historical archetypes: marginalized contemporary landscapes, refracted still life, performance-based portraiture and process-oriented abstraction. Her book Recorder (2021), is a three-part series of images which departed from a singular work: Welcome Water (2015), where Lichtenstein collaborated with the artist J. Stoner Blackwell on a sprawling sculptural floor piece. This collaboration marked a shift in Lichtenstein's work, which involves a layering and compression of analog and digital processes.

== Notable exhibitions ==
Group exhibitions

2017 Where does the Future Get Made, Lishui Biennial Photography Festival, Lishui 2015 Artist’s Choice: An expanded field of Photography, Organized by Liz Deschenes, Mass MoCA, North Adams, MA 2015 Works from the Collection, Baltimore Museum of Art, Baltimore, MD 2014 The Polaroid Years: Instant Photography and Experimentation, Organized by Mary-Kay Lombino, Norton Museum of Art, West Palm Beach, FL 2012 Lucie Fontaine: Estate, Organized by Nicola Trezzi, Marianne Boesky Gallery, New York, NY 2011 Channel to the New Image, Friedrich Petzel Gallery, New York, NY 2011 Involuntary, organized by Neville Wakefield, fordPROJECT, New York, NY 2010 Mouvement d'Art Public, Montreal, Canada 2010 Haunted: Contemporary Photography/Video/Performance, organized by Jennifer Blessing, Solomon R. Guggenheim Museum, New York, NY 2007 Currents: Recent Acquisitions, organized by Anne Ellegood, Hirshhorn Museum and Sculpture Garden, Washington, D.C. 2006 Strange Powers, Organized by Laura Hoptman and Peter Eleey, Creative Time, New York 2002 Guide to Trust No. 2, Yerba Buena Center for the Arts, San Francisco 2001 Detourism, organized by Hamza Walker, Renaissance Society, University of Chicago 2001 Nightscapes, Stadthaus Ulm, Ulm, Germany 2001 The Altoids Collection, Organized by Anne Ellegood, New Museum of Contemporary Art, New York 2001 Extraordinary: Place in American Photography, organized by Sara Krajewski, Madison Arts Center, Madison, WI 1999 Playing Off Time, organized by Richard Klein, Aldrich Museum of Contemporary Art, Ridgefield, CT 1998 Spectacular Optical, organized by Lia Gangitano, Thread Waxing Space, New York, Museum of Contemporary Art, Miami

Solo exhibitions

2016 Sound and Noise, Museum of Contemporary Art, Tucson, AZ 2015 more Me than mine, Elizabeth Dee, New York, NY 2014 Polaroids, The Gallery at Hermes, New York, NY 2012 Dance Serpentine (Doubled and Refracted), Austin Museum of Art-Arthouse, Austin, TX 2011 The Suburban, Oak Park, IL 2010 Elizabeth Dee Gallery, New York 2009 Gallery Min Min, Tokyo 2007 Elizabeth Dee Gallery, New York, Gallery Min Min, Tokyo 2007 Artforum, Berlin 2006 Miranda Lichtenstein, UCLA Hammer Museum, Los Angeles 2006 The Searchers, Elizabeth Dee Gallery, New York, Mary Goldman Gallery, Los Angeles, Gallery Min Min, Tokyo 2004 Danbury Road, Gallery Min Min, Tokyo 2003 Landmark, Elizabeth Dee Gallery, New York 2003 Thin Air, Mary Goldman Gallery, Los Angeles, Gallery Min Min, Tokyo 2001 Sanctuary for a Wild Child, Whitney Museum at Phillip Morris, New York 2001 Lovers Lane, Leslie Tonkonow, New York

== Collections ==
Miranda Lichtenstein’s work is held in the collections of The Hirshhorn Museum, Washington, DC, Solomon R. Guggenheim Museum, New York, Baltimore Museum of Art, Baltimore, MD, Madison Museum of Contemporary Art, Wisconsin, Henry Art Museum, Seattle WA, and Neuberger Museum, Purchase, NY.

== Awards ==
Rome Prize Fellowship (2020) Civitella Ranieri Foundation, Umbertide, Italy (2009). The Giverny Residency Program and Fellowship, Claude Monet Foundation, Giverny, France (2002).
