= Kathleen McShane =

American artist (born 1964)

- Born: 1964 (age 61–62); Cleveland, Ohio, U.S.
- Education: New York State College of Ceramics at Alfred University; Cranbrook Academy of Art
- Employer: University of Michigan; College for Creative Studies; Texas State University
- Awards: Guggenheim Fellowship (2025)

Kathleen McShane (born 1964) is an American artist. A 2025 Guggenheim Fellow, her work uses psychological conceptualism and reductive abstraction as themes. She has also worked as a teacher at the University of Michigan, the College for Creative Studies, and Texas State University.

== Biography ==
McShane was born in 1964 in Cleveland, Ohio. She obtained a Bachelor of Fine Arts degree from the New York State College of Ceramics at Alfred University in 1986 and a Master of Fine Arts degree in Printmaking from the Cranbrook Academy of Art in 1990. While she was at Cranbrook, her minimalist zinc etching "Disparity Re/deflection", part of the school's 1990 printmaking department exhibition "Engines of Perception", was praised as "deceptively modest" by John Carlos Cantu of The Ann Arbor News, who also said that her "purposeful visual bouncing of [the word "disparity"] forces the viewer to fully consider its conceptual meaning and [...] to also come to terms with its social meaning." In 1999, she was a MacDowell Colony Fellow. She also worked for Sol LeWitt and Pat Steir as a studio assistant.

McShane's work involves "collage elements within an implied, abstract landscape" and uses psychological conceptualism and reductive abstraction as themes. One installation of hers, where she "paper[ed] the walls of a room with graph paper and strategically cuts out droopy tear-like shapes", was displayed at the Aldrich Museum of Contemporary Art in 2001. Her pop art-inspired drawing was part of the 2007 Art Complex Museum exhibition "Etch and Sketch".

In 2024, Neil Fauerso of Glasstire described her installation Out(side) of Time (stylized in all-caps), located at TXST Galleries in Texas State University, as "visually dazzling and imbued with a relaxed profundity". In 2025, she was awarded a Guggenheim Fellowship in Fine Arts.

Her work is in the permanent collection of the McNay Art Museum and Portland Art Museum.

As a university teacher, she originally worked at the University of Michigan and at the College for Creative Studies, before moving to Texas State University.

McShane lives in Fayetteville, Texas.
