= Mihaela Moscaliuc =

Romanian poet and translator (born 1972)

- Born: 1972 (age 53–54); Romania
- Education: Alexandru Ioan Cuza University (honours diploma); Salisbury University (MA); New England College (MFA); University of Maryland, College Park (PhD)
- Occupations: Poet; translator
- Spouse: Michael Waters
- Children: 1
- Writing career
- Notable awards: Guggenheim Fellowship (2025)

Academic background
- Thesis: Translating Eastern European Identities into the American National Narrative (2006)
- Doctoral advisor: Sangeeta Ray

Mihaela Diana Moscaliuc (born 1972) is a Romanian poet and translator based in the United States. A 2025 Guggenheim Fellow, she has published several poetry volumes — Father Dirt (2010), Immigrant Model (2015), Cemetery Ink (2021), and Heartmoor (2026) — as well as many edited volumes and translations.

== Biography ==
Moscaliuc was born and raised in the northern half of Romania, which was at the time a communist state. She recalled that despite learning English in junior high, she felt the country "was still a prison in which dreaming was the only freedom". The Romanian revolution liberated the country shortly before her 18th birthday.

After obtaining her joint honours diploma in English and Spanish language and literature from Alexandru Ioan Cuza University (UAIC), Moscaliuc emigrated to the United States in the 1990s. She obtained an MA from Salisbury University, as well as an MFA in creative writing from New England College. She obtained a PhD in American literature at the University of Maryland, College Park in 2006; her doctoral dissertation Translating Eastern European Identities into the American National Narrative was supervised by Sangeeta Ray.

After serving as an adjunct faculty member at Monmouth University and as the MFA program director (2011-2012) for Drew University, Moscaliuc became a professor at Monmouth's Department of English, where she is graduate program director. At Monmouth, she teaches courses on literary studies and creative writing, as well as poetry workshops. She also works at Plume as their translation editor.

Moscaliuc appeared as a World Literature Today Emerging Author in their March/April 2010 issue, where she was introduced by Gerald Stern. In 2010, she released her first poetry collection, Father Dirt, which won the Kinereth Gensler Award. She later wrote three more poetry volumes: Immigrant Model (2015), Cemetery Ink (2021), and Heartmoor (2026). She also published a Spanish-language volume, Algunos poemas fugitivos, translated by Frances Simán and published by Ecuadorian publishing house El Ángel Editor in 2023. Her translation work includes The Hiss of the Viper (2014) and Clay and Star (2019). She also edited Insane Devotion (2016), a festschrift on Gerald Stern, and alongside Michael Waters co-edited Border Lines (2020) and Fruits of the Earth: Harvest Poems (2025).

Moscaliuc was a 2015 Fulbright Scholar at UAIC, located in her native Romania. In 2019, she was awarded a MacDowell Colony in nonfiction literature and poetry. In 2025, she was awarded a Guggenheim Fellowship in Poetry.

Critics have noted the presence of Moscaliuc's Romanian upbringing as a theme within her poetry collections. Lori Wilson compared her to Polina Barskova, Ana Božičević, and Lucyna Prostko for their "share[d] Eastern European poetic lineage [despite] the diversity of their poetics and imaginations". She wrote a poem dedicated to George Floyd and Freddie Gray, two African-American men killed by police brutality. Regarding her translation style, Moscaliuc stated that she sees Romanian's nature as a Romance language as an advantage but "less in terms of my own translation process".

She has one son with her husband, poet Michael Waters. As of 2010, Moscaliuc lived in Ocean Township, Monmouth County, New Jersey.

== Books ==
=== Poetry volumes ===
- Father Dirt (2010)
- Immigrant Model (2015)
- Cemetery Ink (2021)
- Heartmoor (2026)

=== Translations ===
- (originally by Carmelia Leonte) The Hiss of the Viper (2014)
- (originally by Liliana Ursu) Clay and Star (2019)

=== Edited volumes ===
- Insane Devotion (2016)
- (with Michael Waters) Border Lines (2020)
- (with Michael Waters) Fruits of the Earth: Harvest Poems (2025)
