= Aubrey Kelly (scientist) =

American neurobiologist

- Occupation: Neuroscientist
- Spouse: Rick Thompson
- Awards: Guggenheim Fellowship (2025)

Academic background
- Education: University of California, San Diego; University of Indiana Bloomington
- Thesis: Vasopressin and oxytocin mechanisms of avian social phenotypes (2014)
- Doctoral advisor: James L. Goodson

Academic work
- Sub-discipline: Neuropsychology
- Institutions: Emory University

Aubrey Michelle Kelly is an American neurobiologist who specializes in neurological aspects of social behavior. She is an associate professor at Emory University, and is a 2025 Guggenheim Fellow.

== Biography ==
Kelly, a native of San Diego, did undergraduate research on bird courtship behavior at the University of California, San Diego. where she obtained a BA summa cum laude in Psychology from the in 2007, Following a gap year as a research assistant at UCSD, she obtained a PhD in biology and neuroscience from the University of Indiana Bloomington in 2014; her dissertation Vasopressin and oxytocin mechanisms of avian social phenotypes was supervised by James L. Goodson.

After working as a postdoctoral fellow at Cornell University under Alexander G. Ophir in 2014, Kelly joined the Emory University Department of Psychology as an assistant professor in August 2018. She was promoted to associate professor in 2024.

Kelly's research centers on neurological aspects of social behavior, and the Kelly Lab uses spiny mice to study prosocial behavior in animals. In 2022, she and her husband conducted a study showing that testosterone can positive prosocial behavior by interacting with oxytocin cells; published in Proceedings of the Royal Society B, it relied on a sample of Mongolian gerbils. In 2025, Kelly was awarded a Guggenheim Fellowship in Neuroscience; she said that the fellowship would be used to collaborate with other neurophysiologists in the United States and Europe on researching neural interpretation of group cohesiveness.

Kelly is married to Rick Thompson, a professor of psychology, neuroscience and behavioral biology at Oxford College of Emory University; the two met after a scientific collaboration, with the relationship growing after the two moved to Emory. The couple have a dog, two cats, and seven chickens.
