= Roger Mathew Grant =

Music theorist

Roger Mathew Grant is a music theorist specializing in the eighteenth century. He also works as a dramaturge, for example with Canadian filmmaker Bruce LaBruce on a film version of Arnold Schoenberg's "Pierrot Lunaire." Grant teaches at Wesleyan University.

== Work ==
According to a recent interview, Grant believes that "during the eighteenth century, debates within musical aesthetics re-scripted the role that performing musicians play in the creation and communication of affect."

== Publications ==
=== Books ===
- Grant, Roger Mathew (2014). Beating Time and Measuring Music in the Early Modern Era New York: Oxford University Press. OCLC 1028553445.
- Grant, Roger Mathew (2020). Peculiar Attunements: How Affect Theory Turned Musical. New York: Fordham University Press. OCLC 1144094031.

=== Articles ===
- Grant, Roger Mathew (2008). “Hysteria at the Musical Surface." Music Theory Online 14 (1): n.p.
- Grant, Roger Mathew (2013). “Ad infinitum: Numbers and Series in Early Modern Music Theory.” Music Theory Spectrum 35 (1): 62–76.
- Grant, Roger Mathew (2017). “Peculiar Attunements: Comic Opera and Enlightenment Mimesis.” Critical Inquiry 43 (2): 550–569.

== Awards ==
- Emerging Scholar Award (Book), Society for Music Theory (2016), for Beating Time and Measuring Music in the Early Modern Era
- Stanford Humanities Center, External Faculty Fellowship (2016–2017)

== Projects ==
In 2015 and 2016, Grant collaborated on a "radical reinterpretation" of Mozart's The Magic Flute in an installation at NYU's 80 Washington Square East Gallery with Jonathan Berger, Susanne Sachsse, Vaginal Davis, and Jamie Stewart.

Grant served as musical producer for Pierrot Lunaire (2014), a film by Bruce LaBruce and winner of the Teddy Jury Award, Berlinale International Film Festival.
