= Guillaume Veillet =

French journalist

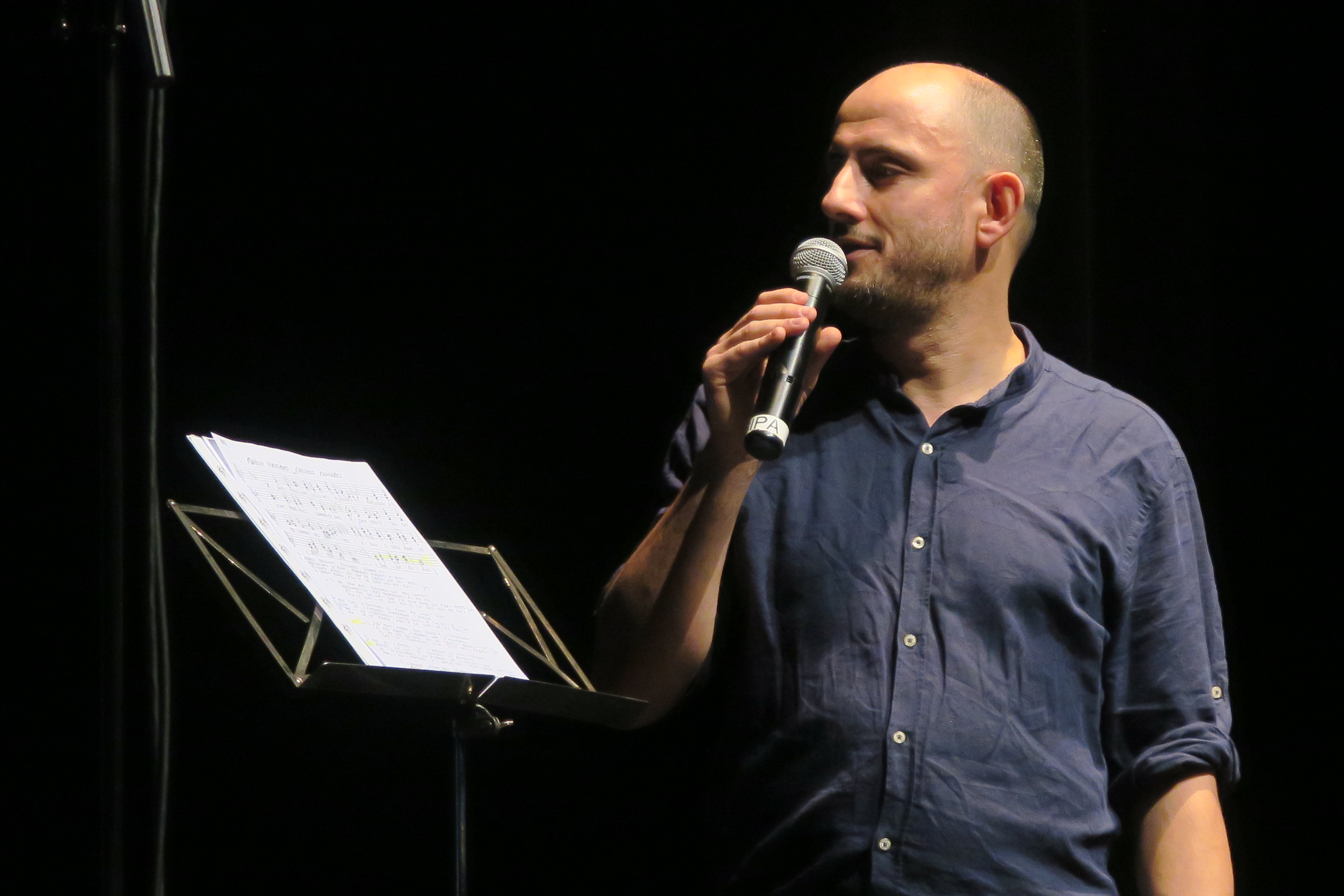
Guillaume Veillet en novembre 2019 à Alby-sur-Chéran

Guillaume Veillet is a French cultural journalist and researcher in ethnomusicology born on June 16, 1975 to Ambilly (Haute-Savoie).

== Biography ==
He studied at the Institute of Political Studies of Grenoble, where he taught from 2001 to 2005. In parallel, he became a journalist (radio, daily press and magazine) specializing in music and more broadly the live performance (theater, contemporary dance, street arts).

He is passionate about traditional music. From 2006 to 2009, he was editor of the magazine Trad Magazine.

In autumn 2009, he released on the label Frémeaux & Associés an anthology of traditional music of France in 10 CDs (whose visual is the work of the American draftsman Robert Crumb). More than 50 associations and archives centers in the region, as well as the INA, the National Library of France, the Museum of Civilizations of Europe and the Mediterranean (MuCEM), the Laval University of Quebec and the Swiss National Sound Archives are partners of this publication, which brings together nearly 300 field recordings between 1900 and 2009. This work was rewarded in January 2010 by the International Grand Prix of Discography of the Académie Charles-Cros, mention "Heritage".

He is also dedicated to the promotion of French music abroad. He collaborates with the English language magazine fRoots and has made several compilations for the British label World Music Network: The Rough Guide to Paris Café Music (2002); The Rough Guide to the Music of France (2003); The Rough Guide to Gypsy Swing (2005); The Rough Guide to the Music of Paris (2007); The Rough Guide to Paris Café 2nd Edition (2010).

He is the author of the website "Languages of France in songs" for the Hall of the song and the Ministry of Culture (General Delegation to the French Language and Languages of France).

He collects 78 rpm records, mainly the music of ball musette of the 1920s and 1930s. In autumn 2010, he released on this theme a box of 2 CDs entitled "Accordion Musette/Swing Paris 1925–1954", fourth volume of a series of reeditions initiated in the early 1990s by the guitarist Didier Roussin, still at Frémeaux & Associés.

It is shared today between Paris and Savoie, where he investigates the oral heritage (song, story, etc.) and works on various projects of publications and exhibitions in this field. In September 2011, he released, in collaboration with Alain Basso and the association Terres d'Empreintes , a book-CD on the traditional song in Haute-Savoie. This book, entitled "Bella Louison" with reference to a well-known harvest song in Savoy, showcases 40 years of sound collecting (from 1966 to 2005). This publication is followed in autumn 2014 by that of "Kroka la nui, traditional songs in Savoie", book-CD dedicated to the small village of Esserts-Blay in which he went for nearly 10 years to record the repertoire of inhabitants. The visual of the book is once again realized by Robert Crumb.

In September 2015, in this same collection, there is a third volume, "Triolèt", dedicated to the song in Savoyard language (the francoprovençal or arpitan) and co-written with the writer, director and painter Valère Novarina, who is also responsible for the visual of the book.

The fourth volume of the collection, "Bessans who sings", comes out in the summer of 2016. It highlights the sung repertoire of the village of Bessans, in Maurienne, and combines historical recordings made since the 1960s with recent collections (winter 2015–2016) carried out on site during a major ethnomusicological survey in relation to the inhabitants.

In the summer of 2012, he curated the exhibition "Monte le son! Les Alpes en musiques".
