= Gwen Laster =

American violinist and composer (born 1957/58)

- Born: 1957/1958 (age 67–68); Detroit, Michigan
- Occupations: Violinist; composer
- Awards: Guggenheim Fellowship (2025)

Academic background
- Education: University of Michigan School of Music
- Musical career
- Genre: Jazz
- Instrument: Electric violin

Gwen Laster (born 1957/1958) is an American violinist and composer. Born and raised in Detroit, she obtained her music degrees at the University of Michigan and performed as a jazz violinist. A 2025 Guggenheim Fellow, her work includes three albums, as well as a "Black Lives Matter Suite".

== Biography ==
Laster was born in 1957 or 1958 in western Detroit, raised in a working-class family. She became interested in electro-synthetized jazz as a teenager, and she learned electric violin at Northwestern High School. She taught under Joe Striplin, and she attended her first music camp in the University of Wisconsin at Madison. She obtained her BM and MM at the University of Michigan.

In 1993, she moved to New York City, living in a Fort Greene apartment. She was a string player for the Flint Symphony Orchestra for ten years. In 1991, she led a quintet called The Gwen Laster Project, featuring herself, Al Duncan, Buster Marbury, David McMurray, and Daryl Smith. Denis Naranjo of The Flint Journal said that she is "not just another Jean-Luc Ponty" clone. In 1992, she won the Cognac Hennessy Best of Detroit Jazz Search contest as part of the group Gwen Laster Featuring Larry Fratangelo. She released two albums through her own label Muffymarie: Sneak Preview (1996) and I Hear You Smiling (2004).

In August 2004, she did a violin performance at the Detroit Institute of Arts. In June 2006, she played for a concert at Somers High School raising funds for the Costa Rican refugee camp La Carpio. In 2008, she performed at a concert for the first inauguration of Barack Obama. In 2012, she released another album, Gameboard.

She formed the quartet New Muse 4tet in 2015 with Hsinwei Chiang, Melanie Dyer, and Alex Waterman; they compose "freedom songs", which Jasmine Ivanna Espy describes as "compositions by contributors to the civil rights movement". Laster had been inspired to write the "Black Lives Matter Suite" of their album Blue Lotus by her experiences in police custody, where she recalled passing out and being traumatized with a near-death experience. John Pietaro gave the album four stars out of five, while Haviland S Nichols of Chronogram called it proof that "black lives still matter".

During the COVID-19 pandemic in Chicago, she performed for the Quarantine Concerts at the Experimental Sound Studio. In 2025, she was awarded a Guggenheim Fellowship.

She has also worked as a backup musician for pop artists, with examples being Burt Bacharach, Aretha Franklin, Jay-Z, Alicia Keys, Johnny Mathis, Luciano Pavarotti, and Smokey Robinson. She also works at Bard College as a visiting artist-in-residence, and she was a violin teacher in Brooklyn and Putnam County, including as jazz string director at Harlem School of the Arts. She is founder of string instrument education program Creative Strings Improvisers Orchestra.

Living in Cold Spring in 2006, she lives in Beacon, New York as of 2025. She is a member of American Federation of Musicians Local 802.
