= Katherine Jansen =

American historian

Katherine L. Jansen
- Citizenship: American
- Occupation: Historian
- Awards: Guggenheim Fellowship (2025); John Gilmary Shea Prize; Phi Alpha Theta First Book Prize

Academic background
- Education: Princeton University (Ph.D.)
- Doctoral advisor: William C. Jordan

Academic work
- Institutions: Catholic University of America
- Main interests: Medieval Italy, religious cultures, women and gender studies
- Notable works: The Making of the Magdalen (2000); Peace and Penance in Late Medieval Italy (2018)

Katherine L. Jansen is an American historian of the Middle Ages and Ordinary Professor Emerita at the Catholic University of America in Washington, D.C., where she taught from 1994-2024. She has also served as Visiting Professor at the Johns Hopkins University and Princeton University.

== Biography ==
She received her Ph.D. from Princeton University, a student of William C. Jordan. Her scholarly interests are in the history of medieval Italy, religious cultures, and women and gender studies. Her first book was awarded the John Gilmary Shea Prize from the American Catholic Historical Association and the prize for the first book in the field of history from the Phi Alpha Theta society. She has held fellowships from the Fulbright Foundation, the American Academy in Rome, Villa I Tatti, the National Endowment for the Humanities, the American Council of Learned Societies, Institute for Advanced Study and Princeton University, among others. In 2025, she received a Guggenheim Fellowship from the John Simon Guggenheim Memorial Foundation to complete her book entitled, The Relics of Rome.

In 2020, she was elected a Fellow of the Medieval Academy of America, and from 2019-2025 she served as Editor of Speculum: A Journal of Medieval Studies.

== Selected publications ==
- The Making of the Magdalen: Preaching and Popular Devotion in the Later Middle Ages, publisher Princeton: Princeton University Press, 2000.
- Medieval Italy: Texts in Translation, co-edited with Frances Andrews and Joanna Drell, publisher Philadelphia: University of Pennsylvania Press, 2009.
- Charisma and Religious Authority: Jewish, Christian and Muslim Preaching, 1200-1500, co-edited with Miri Rubin, publisher Turnhout: Brepols, 2010.
- Center and Periphery: Essays on Power in the Middle Ages in Honor of William Chester Jordan, co-edited with Guy Geltner and Anne E. Lester, publisher Leiden: Brill, 2013.
- Peace and Penance in Late Medieval Italy, publisher Princeton: Princeton University Press, 2018.
