= Accra Shepp =

American artist (born 1962)

- Born: 1962 (age 63–64)
- Education: School of Visual Arts (BFA, MFA)
- Occupation: Photographer
- Father: Archie Shepp
- Website: accrashepp.com

Accra Shepp (born 1962) is an American photographer.

== Early life and education ==
Shepp's father is the saxophonist Archie Shepp.

Accra Shepp has a Masters Degree from the Institute of Fine Arts, NYU in Art History and a B.A. in Art History and Studio Art from Princeton University.

== Art career ==
His work is included in the collections of the Museum of Fine Arts, Houston, the Art Institute of Chicago and the Museum of Modern Art, New York. Other permanent collections include the Whitney Museum of American Art, the Victoria and Albert Museum, London, the Museum of the City of New York, among other institutions.

=== Exhibitions ===
Shepp's work has been exhibited in a solo show at the Queens Museum. Work included in the exhibition documents the coastlines of New York City's boroughs including the city's forty islands.

=== Honors and awards ===
Shepp is a 2025 Guggenheim Fellowship recipient. He has also received two grants from the New York Foundation for the Arts, a fellowship through Princeton University's Atelier program, a Senior Fulbright Fellowship to Indonesia, as well as several international residencies.
