= Caroline Davis (saxophonist) =

Caroline Davis, née Caroline Rebecca Anson, (b. July 7, 1981) is a saxophonist, flautist, composer, and educator.

== Background ==
Davis was born in Singapore, Singapore, to Michael Anson (British) and actress Susanne Anson (Swedish). When she was 6 years old, her family moved to Atlanta, Georgia, and she began playing saxophone at Sequoyah Middle School. Soon after, her parents divorced and she moved with her mother to Carrollton, Texas, where she attended Blalack Middle School and Newman Smith High School. After high school, she went to The University of Texas at Arlington, where she majored in Cognitive Psychology and Music (2004). During this time, she was also introduced to the education program at Litchfield Jazz Camp, in Connecticut. Her love for jazz blossomed here, while at the same time, she continued her academic path at Northwestern University and received a Ph.D in Music Cognition in 2010. After her studies, she served as an adjunct instructor at Northwestern University, DePaul University, and Columbia College Chicago.

== Career in music ==
Davis kept her involvement with the music industry throughout her years in academia, including her participation in IAJE's Sisters in Jazz Program (2006) and Betty Carter's Jazz Ahead Program (2011). In 2013, Davis moved to Brooklyn, New York to pursue her path as a professional musician.

In 2018, she was at the top of DownBeat magazine's Critic's Poll Alto-Saxophone Rising Star list.

In 2019, Davis was a composer-in-residence at the MacDowell Colony.

== Discography ==
=== As leader ===
- Live Work & Play (Ears & Eyes, 2012)
- Doors: Chicago Storylines (Ears & Eyes, 2015)
- Heart Tonic (Sunnyside, 2018)
- Alula (New Amsterdam, 2019)
- Anthems (Sunnyside, 2019)
- Portals Vol. 1: Mourning (Sunnyside, 2021)
- Portals Vol. 2: Returning (Intakt, 2024)

=== Collaborative ===
- With Wendy Eisenberg, Accept When (Astral Spirits, 2024)

=== As a sidewoman ===
- B Forrest, Back to Bodhi (self, 2015)
- Paul Bedal, Chatter (Ears & Eyes, 2014)
- Paul Bedal, Mirrors (Bace, 2018)
- James Davis, Angles of Refraction (Ears & Eyes, 2007)
- Dion Kerr, Reptile Ground (self, 2015)
- Lee Konitz, Old Songs New (Sunnyside, 2019)
- Neak, Kwesbaar (self, 2019)
- Neak, Love Greater (self, 2012)
- Pedway, Subventure (Ears & Eyes, 2008)
- Pedway, Passion Ball (Ears & Eyes, 2013)
- Saba, Comfort Zone (Saba Pivot, LLC, 2014)
- Curt Sydnor, Deep End Shallow (Out of Your Head, 2020)
- Whirlpool, This World and One More (Ears & Eyes, 2014)
- Whirlpool with Ron Miles, Dancing on the Inside (Ears & Eyes, 2015)
- Wolff Parkinson White, Favours (2020)
- Zing!, Magnetic Flux (Ears & Eyes, 2007)

== Website ==
- https://www.carolinedavis.org/
- Caroline Davis Interview on The Tonearm Podcast
