= Caroline Davis (publishing) =

Dr Caroline Davis, Publishing Media expert and university academic

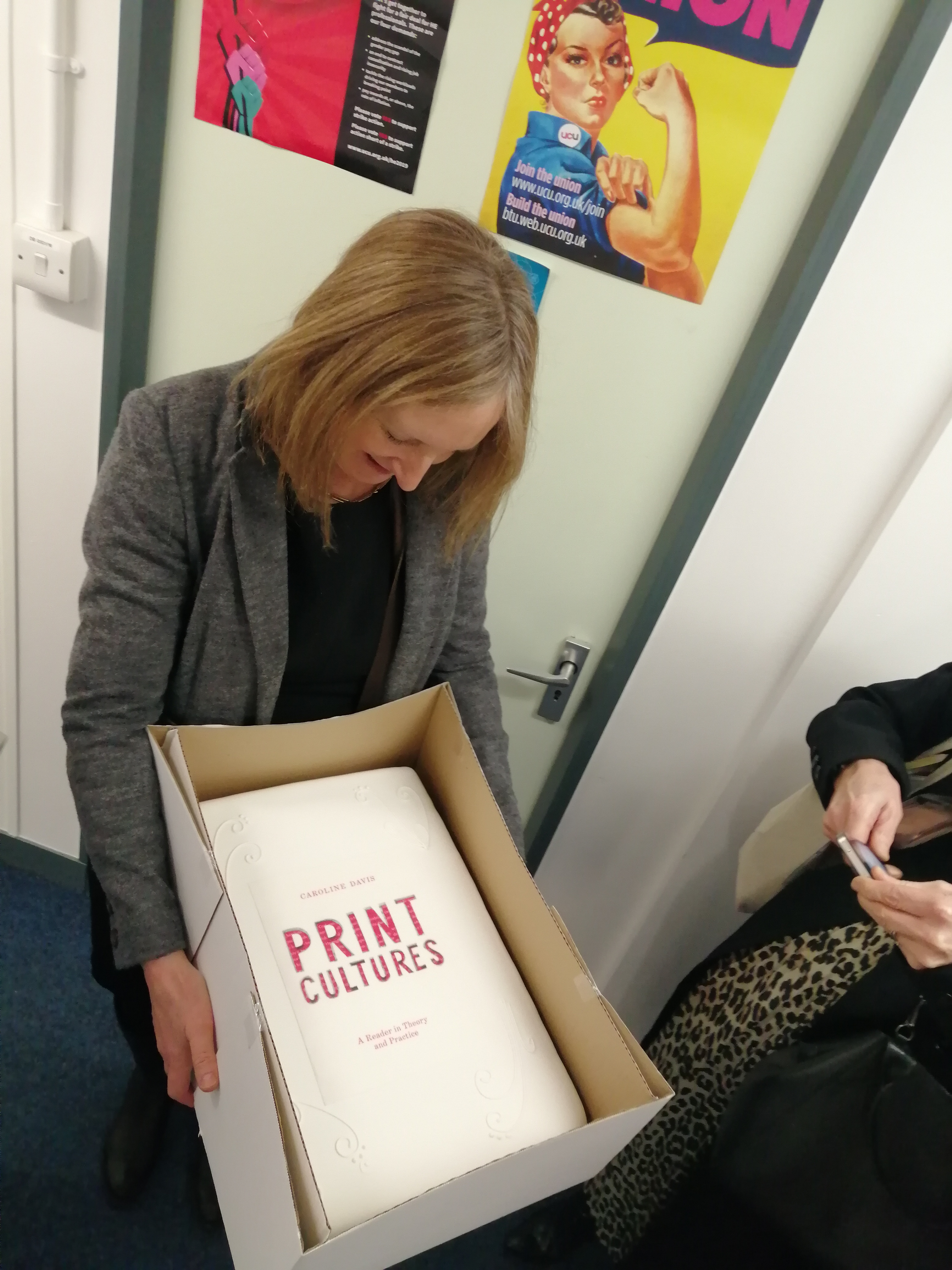
- Dr Caroline Davis, 2020, holding a cake decorated with the cover of her book 'Print Cultures'.
- Education: PhD (English Literature), Open University. Postgraduate Certificate of Teaching in Higher Education, Oxford Brookes University. MA (English), University of York. BA (English and History), University of Birmingham.
- Occupation(s): Professor, author
- Employer: University College London
- Known for: Academic of digital and publishing media
- Awards: Mid-Career Fellowship (British Academy)

Caroline Davis is a British academic who specialises in the history of publishing culture, and government propaganda in Africa during the Cold War. She is currently an Associate Professor in Publishing at University College London.

== Career ==
Caroline Davis began her career working with Digital Media for Oxford University Press before moving onto teaching Digital Humanities at Oxford university. She then became a senior lecturer in Publishing Media at Oxford Brookes University. In 2021 she became the leader for the editing, writing, communication, and 'theories of the book' modules as an Associate Professor in Publishing at University College London.

Davis specialises in post-colonial publishing in Africa with a focus on the CIA relationship with the publishing industry during the Cold War, and has a strong interest in print cultures in South Africa. In 2019 she became a winner of the Mid-Career Fellowship awarded by the British Academy.

== Selected publications ==
=== Books ===
- African Literature and the CIA: Networks of Authorship and Publishing. 2020 (Cambridge University Press)
- Print Cultures: A Reader in Theory and Practice. 2019. (Macmillan Education)
- The Book in Africa. 2015. (Palgrave Macmillan UK)

=== Journal articles ===
- 'A Question of Power: Bessie Head and her Publishers' Journal of Southern African Studies 44 (3) (2018) pp. 491–506 ISSN 0305-7070, 1465-3893
- 'Publishing anti-apartheid literature: Athol Fugard's Statements plays Journal of Commonwealth Literature 48 (1) (2013) pp. 113–129 ISSN 0021-9894.
- 'Publishing Wole Soyinka: Oxford University Press and the creation of "Africa's own William Shakespeare" Journal of Postcolonial Writing 48 (4) (2012) pp. 344–358 ISSN 1744-9855.
- 'Histories of publishing under apartheid: Oxford University Press in South Africa' Journal of Southern African Studies 37 (1) (2011) pp. 79–98 ISSN 0305-7070, 1465-3893.
