= Elizabeth Otto =

Art historian (born 1970)

- Born: 1970 (age 55–56)

Academic background
- Education: Oberlin College; Queen's University at Kingston; University of Michigan
- Thesis: Figuring gender : photomontage and cultural critique in Germany's Weimar Republic (2003)

Elizabeth Otto (born 1970) is an American art historian known for her feminist work on the Bauhaus. She is a professor at the State University of New York at Buffalo.

== Biography ==
Born in 1970, Otto has a B.A. from Oberlin College and an M.A. from Queen's University at Kingston. In 2003 she received her Ph.D. in Art History from the University of Michigan.

Otto is a Professor of Modern and Contemporary Art at the State University of New York at Buffalo From 2013–2019, she was the Executive Director of the University at Buffalo's Humanities Institute. Otto is the author of the books Haunted Bauhaus: Occult Spirituality, Gender Fluidity, Queer Identities, and Radical Politics (2019) and Tempo, Tempo! The Bauhaus Photomontages of Marianne Brandt (2005). With Patrick Rössler, she co-authored Bauhaus Women: A Global Perspective.

Otto is a 2025 Guggenheim Fellowship recipient. She has also received fellowships from the National Humanities Center, the Center for Advanced Study in the Visual Arts at the National Gallery of Art,

the Getty Research Institute, and the United States Holocaust Memorial Museum.
