= Alpert Awards in the Arts =

American arts award, established 1994

The Herb Alpert Award in the Arts was established in the 1994 by The Herb Alpert Foundation in collaboration with the California Institute of the Arts. The Herb Alpert Foundation, which included then-present Kip Cohen, and benefactors Herbert and Lani Alpert, approached then-CalArts president Steven Lavine with the proposition of providing opportunities for young artists studying at the institute to engage with current American artists. By facilitating this forum for student artists, it would provide them with the best possible professional training. CalArts previously established a relationship with Herb Alpert from his support of the jazz program at the School of Music.

Initially, the Alpert Foundation provided a $50,000 award to five early mid-career artists. Artist are selected in the disciplines of dance, film and video, music, theatre, and visual arts, each representative of five of the six schools at CalArts. In order to be selected for the award, there is a two-tier process of nominators and panelists. Each year, the CalArts faculty determines fifty artists and art professionals as nominators to select two artist each. 100 artists are then invited to apply to award, which will be judged by panel of three experts in each discipline (15 total). According to the foundation, the awards are chosen by a panel of experts and are given to risk-taking artists typically in their mid-careers. The foundation attempts to identify artists who were sensitive to the artist's potential contribution to society. Awardees spend a week at CalArts, lecturing, offering classes, and meeting individually with current students. In addition to the residency, recipients have also shown or performed their work at CalArts' professional arts theater, REDCAT, in downtown Los Angeles.

In 2010, the foundation in increased its annual fellowship to $75,000. In 2021, the Foundation increased the number of recipients to two in each discipline, comprising with a total of ten awardees each year.

In 2026, the Herb Alpert Foundation created a new prize named the Herb Alpert Honor, whose first recipient is Gustavo Dudamel and the Dudamel Foundation. The award consists of a 1‑million‑dollar grant, aimed at supporting Dudamel’s work in music education and youth-focused programs through his foundation.

Year	Film/Video	Visual Arts	Theatre	Dance	Music
1995	Leslie Thornton	Mel Chin	Reza Abdoh	Ann Carlson	James Carter
1996	Su Friedrich	Carrie Mae Weems	Suzan-Lori Parks	David Roussève	Anne LeBaron
1997	Craig Baldwin	Kerry James Marshall	Lisa Kron	Victoria Marks	Chen Yi
1998	Jeanne C. Finley	Roni Horn	Danny Hoch	Joanna Haigood	Pamela Z
1999	Lourdes Portillo	Pepon Osorio	Brian Freeman	Ralph Lemon	George Lewis
2000	Peggy Ahwesh	Shirin Neshat	W. David Hancock	Mark Dendy	Steve Coleman
2001	Ellen Bruno	Cai Guo-Qiang	Erik Ehn	John Kelly	Zhou Long
2002	RTMark	Christian Marclay	David Greenspan	Lisa Nelson	Laetitia Sonami
2003	Coco Fusco	Catherine Opie	Carl Hancock Rux	Rennie Harris	Vijay Iyer
2004	Renee Tajima-Peña	Catherine Sullivan	Dan Hurlin	Stephan Koplowitz	Miya Masaoka
2005	Jem Cohen	Harrell Fletcher	Naomi Iizuka	Donna Uchizono	David Dunn
2006	Bill Morrison	Jim Hodges	Daniel Alexander Jones	Sarah Michelson	Lawrence D. Morris
2007	Jacqueline Goss	Walid Raad	Cynthia Hopkins	Jeanine Durning	Mark Feldman
2008	Bruce McClure	Byron Kim	Lisa D'Amour	Pat Graney	Derek Bermel
2009	Paul Chan	Paul Pfeiffer	Rinde Eckert	Reggie Wilson	John King
2010	Jim Trainor	Rachel Harrison	Bill Talen	Susan Rethorst	Lukas Ligeti
2011	Natalia Almada	Emily Jacir	Marc Bamuthi Joseph	Jess Curtis	Nicole Mitchell
2012	Kevin Everson	Michael Smith	Eisa Davis	Nora Chipaumire	Myra Melford
2013	Lucien Castaing-Taylor	Sharon Hayes	Pavol Liska & Kelly Copper	Julia Rhoads	Alex Mincek
2014	Deborah Stratman	Daniel Joseph Martinez	Annie Dorsen	Michelle Dorrance	Matana Roberts
2015	Sharon Lockhart	Tania Bruguera	Taylor Mac	Maria Hassabi	Julia Wolfe
2016	Cauleen Smith	Simone Leigh	Anne Washburn	Ishmael Houston-Jones	Dohee Lee
2017	Kerry Tribe	Amy Franceschini	Daniel Fish	luciana achugar	Eve Beglarian
2018	Arthur Jafa	Michael Rakowitz	Robert O'Hara	Okwui Okpokwasili	Courtney Bryan
2019	Beatriz Santiago Muñoz	Cecilia Vicuña	Lloyd Suh	Pam Tanowitz	Meshell Ndegeocello
2020	Sky Hopinka	Firelei Báez	Phil Soltanoff	Karen Sherman	Christian Scott
2021	Kahlil Joseph, Adam Khalil	Tanya Lukin Linklater, Steffani Jemison	Kimber Lee, Kaneza Schaal	Beth Gill, Will Rawls	David Virelles, Toshi Reagon
2022	Bani Khoshnoudi, Terence Nance	Guadalupe Maravilla, Martine Syms	Virginia Grise, Aleshea Harris	Nia Love, Yanira Castro	Tomeka Reid, Cory Smythe
2023	Christopher Harris, Madeleine Hunt-Ehrlich	American Artist, Park McArthur	Whitney White, Tania El Khoury	Makini [jumatatu m. poe] and Jermone Donte Beacham, Ayodele Casel	Erin Gee, Linda May Han Oh
2024	Lucy Raven, Nuotama Bodomo	Marie Watt, Marina Rosenfeld	Cannupa Hanska Luger, Robin Frohardt	Mariana Valencia, Jonathan González	Huang Ruo, Anna Webber
2025	Nazli Dinçel , Ja'Tovia Gary	Azza El Siddique, Sondra Perry	Hansol Jung, Becca Blackwell	David Thomson, Paloma McGregor	Mikel Patrick Avery , Yvette Janine Jackson
