= Uchizono =

Uchizono is a surname. Notable people with the surname include:

- Donna Uchizono, American choreographer
- Hirotaka Uchizono (born 1987), Japanese footballer
