= Ja'Tovia Gary =

American artist and filmmaker

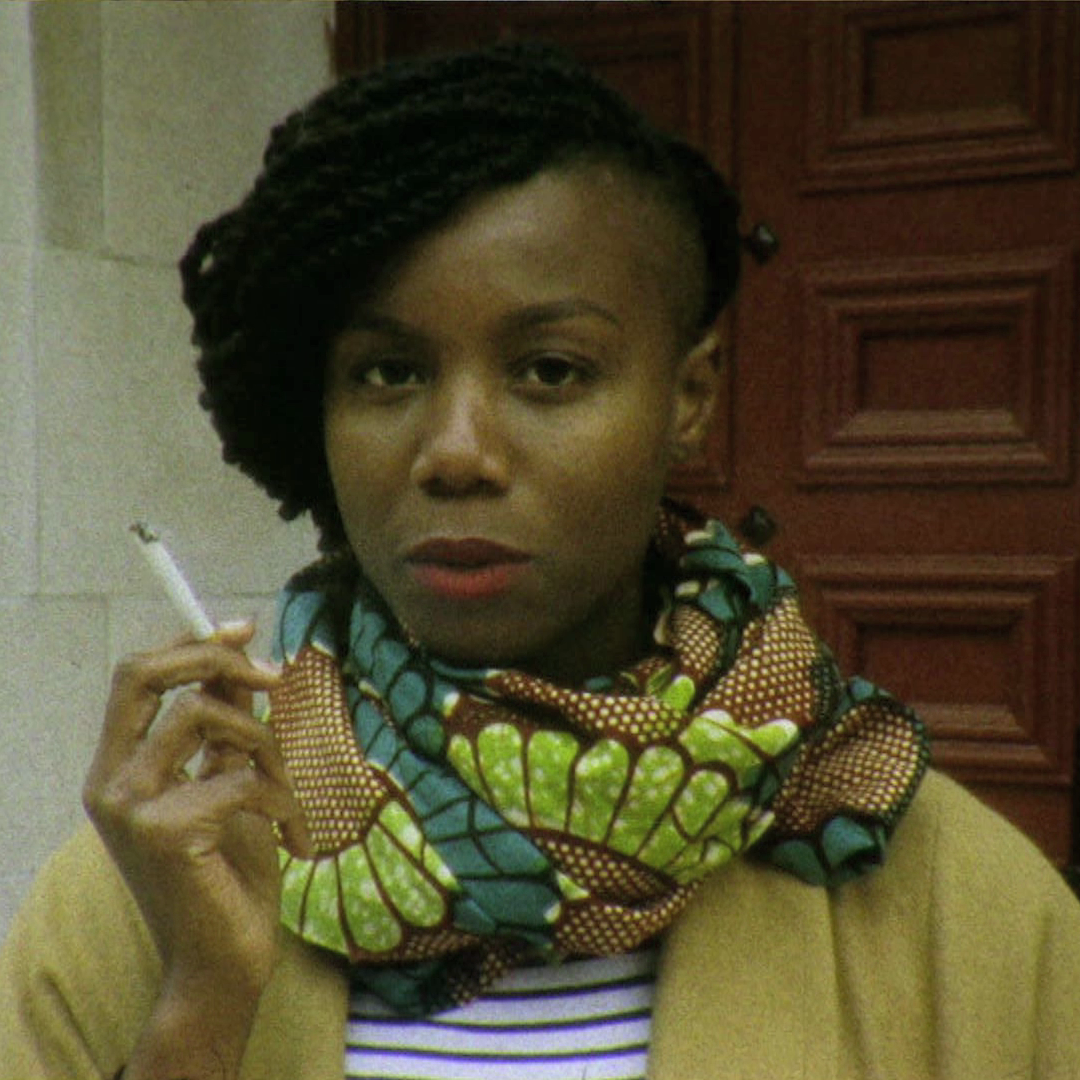
- Ja'Tovia Gary in 2014
- Born: Dallas, Texas
- Education: Brooklyn College (BA); School of Visual Arts (MFA)
- Known for: Filmmaking, interdisciplinary art
- Notable work: The Giverny Document (2019)
- Awards: New Orleans Film Festival Audience Award, Best Experimental Short (2018); New Orleans Film Festival Special Jury Award (2016)
- Website: https://www.jatovia.com/

Ja'Tovia Gary is an American artist and filmmaker from Dallas, Texas. Her work is held in the permanent collections at the Whitney Museum, Studio Museum of Harlem, and others. She is best known for her documentary film The Giverny Document (2019), which received awards including the Moving Ahead Award at the Locarno Film Festival, the Juror Award at the Ann Arbor Film Festival, Best Experimental Film at the Blackstar Film Festival, and the Douglas Edwards Experimental Film Award from the Los Angeles Film Critics Association. Her work often focuses on themes of black feminist subjectivity and uses archival footage.

== Early life and education ==
Gary was born in Dallas, Texas and raised in the nearby suburb of Cedar Hill, in a Pentecostal church community. As a student she was active in local theatre programs and went on to receive her diploma from Booker T. Washington High School for the Performing and Visual Arts.

Gary pursued a professional career in acting but she soon became disheartened by the reductive roles and characters that she was offered. She then enrolled at Brooklyn College and completed a dual bachelor of art degree in Documentary Film Production and Africana Studies.

She later received her MFA in Social Documentary Filmmaking at the School of Visual Arts. She also holds a Documentary Filmmaking Certificate from the LV Prasad Academy in Chennai, India.

== Career ==
=== Filmmaking ===
Gary's work has focused on themes such as black feminist subjectivity and has confronted the history of these subjects by featuring archival footage in her work. Her 2015 short film An Ecstatic Experience combined clips of actress Ruby Dee with an interview of Assata Shakur, using a technique she called "direct animation."

In 2016, Gary participated in the Terra Summer Residency program, in Giverny, France. During that time, she produced her short film Giverny I (Négresse Impériale), which combined video clips of herself with the footage filmed by Philando Castile's girlfriend shortly after he was shot by a police officer. The film is also included in her 2019 documentary The Giverny Document that explores what it means to live life as a Black woman. The film received critical acclaim and garnered awards from festivals including the Blackstar Film Festival and Locarno International Film Festival.

In conversation with Michael B. Gillespie, a film theorist and historian at the Lewis Center for the Arts at Princeton University, Gary described her process: "I am simultaneously creating and destroying, remaking and unmaking. My intimate interaction with the archive... expresses my desire to be a part of it, to make my presence felt in and on that history while also interrogating it." Gillespie noted that "Gary renders film blackness as cinema in the wake, an assemblage of work that poses new circuits and aesthetic accountings of blackness, sociality, and obliteration."

Gary worked as a post-production and archival assistant for Spike Lee's Bad 25 and Shola Lynch's Free Angela and All Political Prisoners, as well as assistant editor on Jackie Robinson, a two-part biographical documentary directed by Ken Burns, Sarah Burns, and David McMahon, which premiered April 2016 on PBS.

Her work has received financial support including the Creative Capital award, support from the DOC Society, the Jerome Foundation, Rooftop Films, the Free History Project, BritDOC, and the Sundance Institute. In 2022 she received a Guggenheim Foundation Fellowship.

=== Other work ===
Gary in a short film made in a 2014 Mono No Aware workshop

In 2008, Gary appeared in Grand Theft Auto IV as Cherise Glover, the random encounters character.

In June 2013, Gary was among the founding members of the New Negress Film Society, a collective of black women filmmakers that seeks to create a community and raise awareness of black female voices and stories in the film industry.

She has taught at The New School and Mono No Aware in New York City.

Gary was a 2018–2019 Radcliffe-Harvard Film Study Center fellow at Harvard University. She is represented by Paula Cooper Gallery in New York, and by Galerie Frank Elbaz in Paris.

== Solo exhibitions ==
2023

- The Giverny Suite, Museum of Modern Art, New York, NY
- Concentrations 64: Ja'Tovia Gary, I KNOW IT WAS THE BLOOD, Dallas Museum of Art, Dallas, TX
- You Smell Like Outside..., Paula Cooper Gallery, New York, NY

2021

- The Giverny Suite, ZOLLAMT MMK, Frankfurt, Germany

2020

- flesh that needs to be loved, Paula Cooper Gallery, New York, NY
- Hammer Projects: Ja'Tovia Gary, Hammer Museum, Los Angeles, CA

2019

- Giverny I (Négresse Impériale), Memorial Art Gallery, University of Rochester, Rochester, NY
- Tactile Cosmologies, Galerie Frank Elbaz, Paris, France
- Screenings 4, University of San Diego Humanities Center Galleries, San Diego, CA

2018

- Giverny I (Négresse Impériale), Boston University Galleries ANNEX, Boston, MA
- A Care Ethic, UC Santa Barbara Museum of Architecture and Design, CA

2017

- Modern Mondays: An Evening with Ja’Tovia Gary, Museum of Modern Art, New York, NY
- An Ecstatic Experience, Atlanta Contemporary, Atlanta, GA

== Permanent collections ==
Gary's work is held in the permanent collections of the following institutions:

- Dallas Museum of Art
- Fort Worth Modern Art Museum
- Museum of Modern Art, New York
- The Brooklyn Museum
- Five Colleges Consortium (Amherst, Hampshire, Mount Holyoke and Smith colleges and the University of Massachusetts Amherst)
- Foundation Louis Vuitton
- Smithsonian National Portrait Gallery
- Hessel Museum of Art
- Block Museum at Northwestern University
- Bowdoin College
- Colby College Museum of Art
- Middlebury College Museum of Art
- The Hammer Museum
- Whitney Museum of American Art
- Art, Design & Architecture Museum of UC Santa Barbara
- Studio Museum of Harlem
- Thoma Foundation
- Memorial Art Gallery

== Accolades and awards ==
2025

- Herb Alpert Award in the Arts., Film and Video

2024

- Trellis Art Fund

2023

- Nancy Graves Foundation Award
- Best Experimental Film at Urbanworld Film Festival, Quiet as It’s Kept
- Special Jury Mention for Experimentation at AFI Fest, Quiet as It’s Kept
- Honorable Mention Experimental Film Jury Award at BlackStar Film Festival, Quiet as It’s Kept

2022

- Guggenheim Fellowship

2020

- Directors’ Choice Award at Spectral Film Festival, The Giverny Document (Single Channel)
- Best Experimental Film at BlackStar Film Festival, The Giverny Document (Single Channel)
- Top Grit Award at Indie Grits Film Festival, The Giverny Document (Single Channel)
- Juror Award at Ann Arbor Film Festival, The Giverny Document (Single Channel)

2019

- Creative Capital award
- Field of Vision Fellow
- Douglas Edwards Experimental Film Award at LA Film Critics Association, The Giverny Document (Single Channel)
- Cinematic Vision special jury mention at Camden International Film Festival, The Giverny Document (Single Channel)
- Moving Ahead Award at Locarno International Film Festival, The Giverny Document (Single Channel)

2018

- Radcliffe Institute Fellow, Harvard University
- Audience Award for Best Experimental Short at New Orleans Film Festival, Giverny I (Négresse Impériale)
- Special Jury Mention for Best Experimental Short at New Orleans Film Festival, Giverny I (Négresse Impériale)

2017

- 25 New Faces of Independent Filmmaking, Filmmaker Magazine
- Sarah Jacobson Grant

2016

- Jury Award at Haverhill Experimental Film Festival, An Ecstatic Experience
- Special Jury Award at New Orleans Film Festival, An Ecstatic Experience

== Filmography ==
2023

- Quiet As It’s Kept - Writer, director, editor, animator

2019

- The Giverny Document (Single Channel) - Writer, director, editor, animator

2017

- The Evidence of Things Not Seen - Director

2015

- An Ecstatic Experience - Writer, director, editor, animator

2013

- Cakes Da Killa: No Homo - Writer, director, editor
- Cakes Da Killa Goodies Goodies Music Video - Director, editor

2012

- Women’ s Work - Writer, director, editor
- Deconstructing Your Mother - Writer, director, editor

2010

- Sound Rite - Writer, director, editor

=== Other work ===
2016

- Black Girl Magic Short documentary, Essence Magazine, Editor

2015

- The Jackie Robinson Film Project, Florentine Films, Assistant Editor

2012

- Spike Lee's Bad 25, 40 Acres and a Mule, Archival Researcher
- Shola Lynch's Free Angela and All Political Prisoners, RealSide Productions, Post Production Assistant

2008

- Grand Theft Auto IV, Rockstar Games, Voice Acting as Cherise Glover

== See also ==
- Black Women Filmmakers
