= In-camera editing =

Film technique

A short film demonstrating matte box effects edited in camera at a Mono No Aware workshop

In-camera editing is a technique where, instead of editing the shots in a film into sequence after shooting, the director or cinematographer instead shoots the sequences in strict order. The resulting "edit" is therefore already complete when the film is developed.

The process takes a lot of planning so that the shots are filmed in the precise order they will be presented. However, some of this time can be reclaimed, as there is no editing, cutting out or reordering scenes later on. When the last scene is filmed by the director or cinematographer, the production is completely finished.

A benefit of the technique, largely now irrelevant due to the rise of digital video, is a reduction in the cost of the production. When the cost of film was a significant fraction of the budget, filmmakers used this technique to optimize film usage.

Because of its apparent simplicity, in-camera editing is also popular with new students who may lack experience with editing, or who want to skip the editing step. It can also be a very educational process because of time and organizational skills that are required. The discipline required to plan out each shot is a useful pedagogical technique. Many introductory video production courses cover the topic of in-camera editing for this very purpose.

The technique may also be used to limit directing and editing interference in a production (often on the part of producers or financiers) because the film exists only as shot, with no options for editing. Any subsequent editing would require costly reshoots and pick-ups.

Finally, if the filmmaker does not have access to film editing equipment (notably, a non-linear editing system), then in-camera editing may be the only available option.

== Notable uses of in-camera editing ==
Alfred Hitchcock used the technique, notably in Rebecca and Rope. Jean-Luc Godard also made use of it in his film Breathless. Both of these directors helped to create in-camera editing in films and led to the technological advancement of in-camera editing.
