= Phil Soltanoff =

American theatre director

Phil Soltanoff is an American theatre director who utilizes a variety of mediums, including music, video and puppetry. Often described as avant-garde, his work eschews traditional narrative. "One of our most interesting multimedia directors," according to The New Yorker.

== Early life ==
Growing up in Stamford, CT, Soltanoff encountered his first theatre experience at eight years old, when his mother took him to a production of Brigadoon. His parents wanted him to become a lawyer, but after attending Kenyon College he found employment at the Sharon Playhouse, where he was hired as a stage manager.

== Career ==
=== Early work in theatre ===
Soltanoff studied for two years at the Hartman Theatre Conservatory before joining Lexington Conservatory Theatre in 1978. That year, appeared as Theodore in the world premiere of Beatrice (Cenci) and the Old Man by Oakley Hall III. The Revengers, his rock opera adaptation (with William C. Sandwick) of Cyril Tourneur's The Revenger's Tragedy debuted at Lexington that summer, followed by the company's Off Broadway production at Playwrights Horizons a few months later.

In 1979, he appeared in LCT's production of Brecht's The Good Woman of Setzuan, for which he composed a well-received score. He returned to compose and perform an original score for LCT's 1980 production of A Midsummer Night's Dream and continued with the company when it moved to Albany to form Capital Repertory Theatre. His work included a prominent role in The Hostage by Brendan Behan.

=== Artist in residence 1984-2003 ===
Soltanoff became the senior artist in residence at Skidmore College in 1984, teaching classes and directing numerous productions, a position that allowed him to teach during part of the year and pursue his own projects the rest of the time. Skidmore productions include Machinal by Sophie Treadwell, The Tooth of Crime by Sam Shepard, and Camino Real by Tennessee Williams. During this period, he also worked at Williamstown Theatre Festival for more than 14 years. He left to pursue his freelance work in 2003.

=== Freelance career and international acclaim ===
In 1996, Soltanoff premiered his first original work To Whom it May Concern. In the piece, twelve men and women dressed in business attire enact their daily routines. It "casts a mesmerizing spell" according to The Village Voice. A response to Silence by John Cage, it was also performed at the Belgrade International Theatre Festival where it was well received. The trip to Belgrade inspired a conversation between Soltanoff and fellow artist Hanne Tierney; two years later, he directed a troupe of ten performers in Peter Handke's The Hour We Knew Nothing of Each Other at Tierney's performance space, followed by the collaboration Strange Attractors. "The work I do is theater," he told The Village Voice, "but derived from movement rather than text." Soltanoff again directed Handke's one-act play at Arizona State University in 2015 and at Skidmore College in 2019.

Soltanoff has collaborated several times with Compagnie 111, a Toulouse-based performance group led by Aurélien Bory. They met the late 1990s, when Soltanoff conducted a workshop in Toulouse and their collaboration grew over time.Plan B, their first collaboration featured four acrobats and jugglers from Compagnie 111. They perform movement amid abstract stage imagery. It was created in 2003 in Toulouse, was staged in New York City in 2004 and performed again at the London International Mime Festival in 2004 and 2013.

2005's More Or Less Infinity, performed by Compagnie 111, was an international success and appeared in several venues in Europe, including the London International Mime Festival. "Watching it is like having your eyes and brain tickled for 70 minutes," said The London Times.

In 2014, Soltanoff and Joe Diebes debuted An Evening with William Shatner Asterisk, without the star's participation or authorization. The show, written by Diebes and directed by Soltanoff, utilized audio and visual imagery, a collage of approximately 6,000 pieces of audio and video comprising footage of Shatner as Capitan Kirk from Star Trek. The New York Times described it as a highlight of the Coil Festival.

This and That was first performed at The Chocolate Factory theatre in New York in 2022. A collaboration with puppeteer Steven Wendt, it features shadow puppetry, video, and other media. The team received the Jim Henson Award for Innovation from Puppeteers of America in 2023, and a Jim Henson Foundation Allelu Award in 2024, supporting the show's presentation at MimeLondon at the Barbican Theatre.

== Style ==
Influenced by modern music such as John Cage and Steven Reich, Soltanoff's style embraces multiple types of media, as well as puppetry and human movement. According to writer Randy Gener, Soltanoff established himself in contrast to narrative theatre, often avoiding spoken words, emphasizing movement, and often performed in non-traditional spaces instead of purpose-built theatres.

== Awards ==
- Doris Duke Charitable Foundation Creative Exploration Fund award (2009)
- Herb Alpert Award in the Arts (2020)
- Puppeteers of America - Jim Henson Award for Innovation (2023)
- Jim Henson Foundation - Allelu Award (2024)

== Productions ==
- To Whom it May Concern (1996)
- The Hour We Knew Nothing of Each Other by Peter Handke (1999)
- Strange Attractors (2000)
- Plan B (2003)
- More or Less Infinity (2005)
- i/o (2007)
- LA Party (2010)
- sitstandwalkliedown (2012)
- An Evening with William Shatner Asterisk (2014)
- This and That (2022)
