= Jeanine Durning =

American choreographer and teacher

- Born: Jeanine Durning
- Occupation: Choreographer

Jeanine Durning is a choreographer, performer, and teacher based in New York. Her work has been presented in Amsterdam, Berlin, Zagreb, Toronto, and across the US.

== Performance work ==
- A Good Man Falls (2002)
- Part One Parting (2004)
- half URGE (2004)
- out of the kennel into a home (2006)
- Ex-Memory: waywewere (2009)
- inging (2010)
- To Being (2015)

== Awards ==
- Alpert Awards in the Arts for Dance (2007)
- New York Foundation for the Arts Award
- McKnight Artist Fellowship (2011)
- Movement Research Artist in Residence
- Gibney Dance Dance in Process Resident
- Brooklyn Artists Space Grant (2013/14)

== Personal life ==
Jeanine is one of three children born to Carol Doughty and actor Charles Durning.
