= Catherine Sullivan =

American artist

Catherine Sullivan (born 1968 in Los Angeles, California) is an associate professor in the Department of Visual Arts at the University of Chicago, and a Chicago-based artist whose work combines theatre/performance, dance, film, music and visual arts. Her installations are mainly in the format of video and film as well as some live performances.

Sullivan's work and installations focus on the actor ensemble as a whole and explore the idea of everyday vs. performed gesture and emotion. She is interested in how the body can hold significance and convey different meanings through these movements, which result in the actor's intense performances. Another focus on Sullivan's work is the typical theatrical conventions and what it means to deconstruct those established narratives. She also frequently includes the use of popular films, real-life historical conflicts and rituals as inspiration for her works.

== Early life ==
Catherine Sullivan was exposed to the visual arts as a child. Her mother worked at the famous Los-Angeles, California-based Gemini G.E.L Print Studio (founded in 1966) which specializes in fine art printmaking. However, she's been drawn to theatre, acting and choreography.

== Education ==
She was educated at the California Institute of Arts where she earned her BFA in Acting and the Art Center College of Design where she earned her MFA in Post-Studio Art. She is a former actor, and studied as a graduate student under Mike Kelley. She currently teaches at the University of Chicago as an Associate Professor of Visual Arts in the Department of Visual Arts.

== Selected Exhibitions/Installations ==
Triangle of Need was a multi-channel video installation at the Walker Art Center, on view from August 23-November 18, 2007. This project was a collaboration with Sean Griffin, Dylan Skybrook, and Kunle Afolayan.

Five Economies (big hunt/little hunt) (2002) was a 2-part work, which included a mural sized 5 screen video installation based on black & white 16mm film material. It restaged scenes from popular films including The Miracle Worker, Marat/Sade, Persona and Whatever Happened to Baby Jane?. These works focus on the choreography and dance elements themselves along with body realization in a theatrical performance through the use of violent and intense/explosive movements. In the restaged scene of The Miracle Worker (Specifically, the famous spoon scene between Helen Keller and her instructor, Annie Sullivan), these gestures and movements resulted in a machine-like rhythm and style from the actors of both Helen and Annie. This rhythm is further enhanced by the use of a male Annie and a fully adult female Helen, in which their motions are slightly out of synch with one another which demonstrates the repetition of Helen's lesson going astray.

'Tis Pity She's a Fluxus Whore (2003) combines filmed re-enactments of a 1953 production of John Ford's play and a 1964 Fluxus performance. Her works D-Pattern and The Chittendens were made in collaboration with the composer Sean Griffin.

Afterword via Fantasia (2015) was a collaborative film installation between Catherine Sullivan, composer and musician George E. Lewis, director Sean Griffin and artist Charles Gaines; which was on display at the Museum of Contemporary Art Chicago (MCA) at The Freedom Principle exhibition. This work was based on Lewis' 2008 book, A Power Stronger Than Itself: The AACM and American Experimental Music, and was screened in conjunction with his opera, Afterword (An Opera). Throughout the film, it deals with themes of miswritten history through the use of contemporary African-American voices and choreography. The use of voice is to combat the erasure of African-American's role in history, which mostly takes place throughout the music portions of the film. Sullivan's choreography blurs the boundary of a single, defined role as the movements are able to be easily replicated by another resulting in a transference of the self which is capable of telling a story of this miswritten history.

== Awards ==
She won an Alpert award in 2004 and her works are held in the collections of the Whitney Museum of American Art, the Tate and the Miami Art Museum. Sullivan has been featured on Art 21 on multiple occasions, being featured in interviews and videos about her process.
