= W. David Hancock =

American playwright

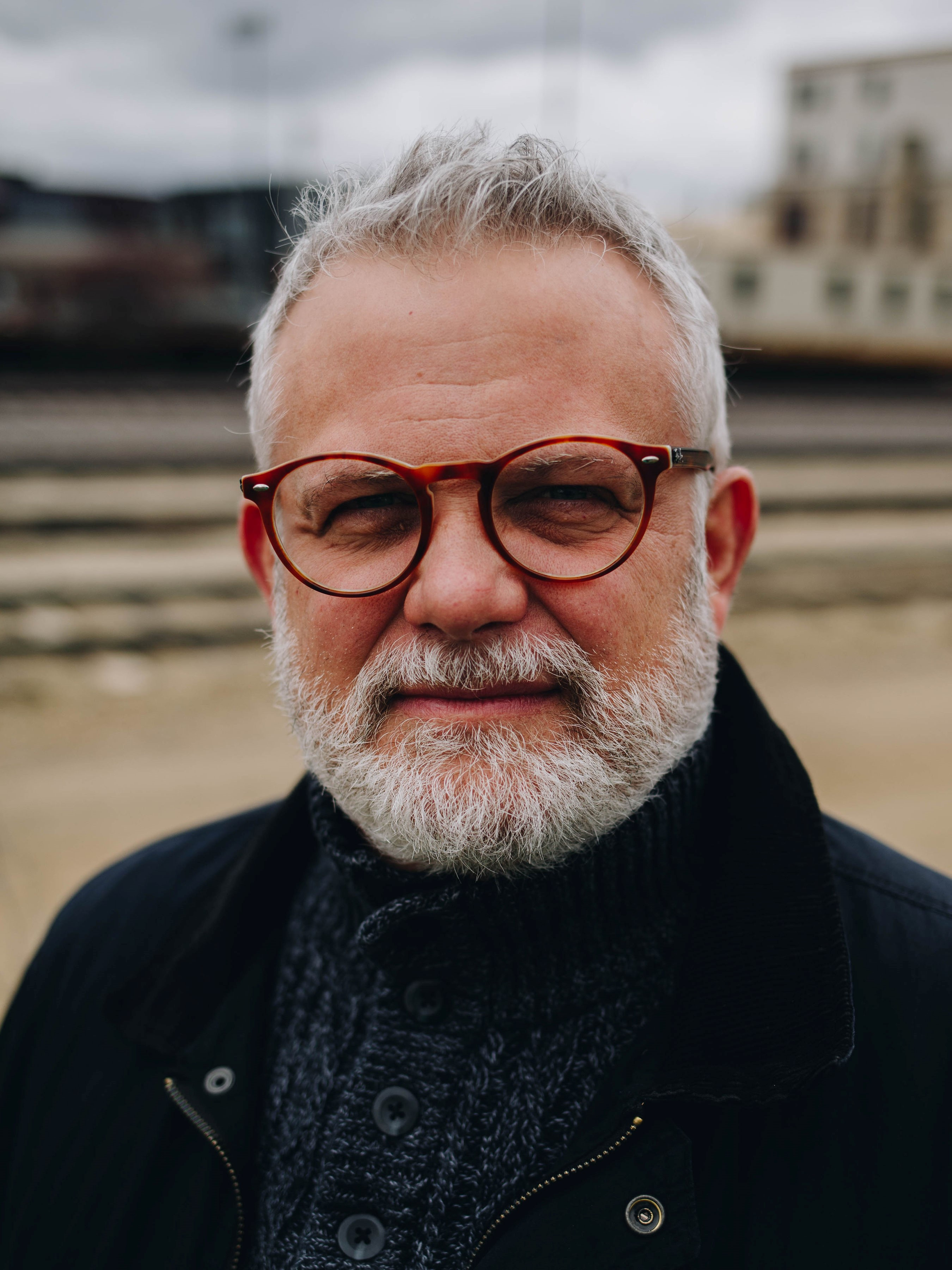
- Hancock in 2019
- Education: Bucknell University (BA); University of Iowa (MFA)
- Years active: 1994-Present
- Awards: Obie Award for Playwriting (1995, 1998)

W. David Hancock is an American playwright, best known for his plays The Race of the Ark Tattoo and The Convention of Cartography. He is a two-time Obie winner for his works with the Foundry Theatre. His experimental, nonlinear work is known for blurring boundaries between artifice and reality, often through unconventional theatrical spaces and an object-centric dramaturgy. As the critic Elinor Fuchs writes, in Hancock’s work, “…we encounter mystery and authenticity at another level entirely.”

== Education ==
Hancock attended Bucknell University, and received his MFA in playwriting from the Playwrights Workshop at the University of Iowa. In Iowa City, where Hancock attended the Workshop, he first presented his play The Convention of Cartography, which would eventually become his first New York production.

== Career ==
Hancock’s play The Convention of Cartography was the premiere production of the Foundry Theatre in 1994. Set in a traveling art museum for a deceased artist named Mike, the play won Hancock his first Obie for Playwriting. Hancock went on to be the most produced playwright at the Foundry Theatre. His second Foundry Theatre production, in 1995, was Deviant Craft, about an asylum of criminally insane women performing The Tempest. Deviant Craft was a Village Voice Choice three weeks in a row. In 1998, the Foundry produced Hancock’s The Race of the Ark Tattoo. One of his most acclaimed works, The Race of the Ark Tattoo takes place inside a working flea market run by Mr. P. Foster, who is selling the artifacts of his deceased foster father, Mr. Homer Phinney. The play won Hancock his second Obie, and subsequently toured nationally and internationally.

In 2002, Hancock wrote The Incubus Archives, presented by the Rude Mechanicals and Hyde Park Theatre in 2002. Reviewing The Incubus Archives, the Austin Chronicle praised Hancock’s construction of, “…a dreamscape -- in which subjects seem to bubble from the darkness of the subconscious…” In 2011, Clubbed Thumb presented his play Our Lot, written in collaboration with Kristin Newbom, as part of their annual Summerworks festival.

Hancock’s play Master was produced by the Foundry Theatre in 2017. The play imagined a retrospective and wake for a fictional Afrofuturist artist named James Leroy “Uncle Jimmy” Clemens, and featured artwork created by Wardell Milan. The New York Times hailed the production as, “disturbing and powerful… the drama is something that seems to be leaking from the very forms so elaborately carpentered to contain it,” and named it a Critic’s Pick. Master was nominated for a Drama Desk Award, and was the final production of the Foundry Theatre.

Hancock’s most recent work, Cathexis, is an interactive, robot facilitated judicial event co-funded by the Creative Europe program of the European Union and a TCG Global Connections grant, co-authored with Nick Millett. Cathexis was created in collaboration with Compagnie Elapse and partners in Holland, Belgium, Serbia and Bosnia. Cathexis was most recently seen at Le Cube’s Centre de Création Numérique in Issy-les-Moulineaux, France.

In addition to his Obies, Hancock has been honored with the Whitting Writers’ Award, CalArts/Alpert Award in Theatre, the Hodder Fellowship, and has been a resident at the MacDowell Colony. Hancock was the McKnight Fellow at the Playwrights Center in Minneapolis. It was his second fellowship with the Center.

As an author of short stories, his work has been featured in The Massachusetts Review, Hunger Mountain Review, and Chicago Quarterly Review.

== Critical reception ==
The critic Elinor Fuchs has described Hancock’s work as a, “theater of objects… a memory theater built as a fire wall against the loss of the past.” While placing Hancock’s plays in conversation with other postmodern artists such as Richard Foreman and the Wooster Group, she also considers Hancock to be pulling on the tradition of the Renaissance memory theater. His work, in her analysis, has a metaphysical scope created by its simultaneous veneer of authenticity and obvious fictionality. In discussing his work with the Foundry, Alisa Solomon notes that Hancock’s productions created a, “heightened, exquisite artifice,” in line with the Foundry’s goal to create its own theatrical worlds, rather than mimic the real world.

His work has influenced a wide range of writers, including Heidi Schreck (What the Constitution Means to Me), and Peggy Stafford.

== Personal life ==
Hancock lives in Minneapolis, with his wife, playwright Kristin Newbom.

== Plays ==
- The Convention of Cartography (1994)
- Deviant Draft (1995)
- The Invisible Medium (1996)
- The Race of the Ark Tattoo (1998)
- The Incubus Archives (2002)
- Leftover Future (2003)
- Our Lot (2011)
- Booth (2011)
- Master (2017)
- Cathexis (2018)

== Awards ==
- 2001 Bush Artist Fellowship
- 2000 CalArts/Alpert Award in Theatre
- 2000 Creative Capital Performing Arts Award
- 1999 Obie Award for Playwriting, The Race of the Ark Tattoo
- 1998 Whiting Writers’ Award
- 1997 Hodder Fellowship
- 1995 Obie Award for Playwriting, The Convention of Cartography
