= Nature Theater of Oklahoma =

The Nature Theater of Oklahoma is a performance art group in New York City. It was started in 2006 by Kelly Copper and Pavol Liška, a married couple who are the artistic directors. The name comes from the novel Amerika by Franz Kafka.

In 2012 and 2013 the pair published OK Radio, a podcast with interviews with figures in alternative theatre, among them Richard Foreman, Young Jean Lee, Oskar Eustis, David Harbour, Anne Bogart and Annie Dorsen.

Young Jean Lee has described the company as "one of the best ensemble theater companies in the world".
