= Stephan Koplowitz =

American artist, director, choreographer

- Born: 1956 (age 69–70); Washington, D.C.
- Education: Wesleyan University (BA music composition); University of Utah (MFA Modern Dance Choreography)
- Known for: contemporary dance site-specific art media arts
- Spouse: Jane Otto
- Awards: Alpert Award in the Arts; Bessie Award; Guggenheim Fellowship
- Website: www.skoplowitz.com

Stephan Koplowitz is a director and choreographer and media artist specializing in site-specific multimedia performances. Since the 1980s, Koplowitz, an international site artist and former Dean of Dance at CalArts, has dedicated himself to site-specific work. He has made work on and for the steps of the New York Public Library, in the halls of London’s Natural History Museum, in a German factory, and in the windows of Grand Central Station Koplowitz was one of 14 artists included in the book Site Dance: Choreographers and the Lure of Alternative Spaces edited by Melanie Kloetzel and Carolyn Pavlik, published by Florida University Press, 2011 In 2022, Koplowitz's book, On Site - Methods for Site-Specific Performance Creation was published by Oxford University Press: https://global.oup.com/academic/product/on-site-9780197515242?cc=us&lang=en&

== Awards and fellowships ==
- 2017 – Rockefeller Foundation Bellagio Center Residency Fellowship
- 2015 – The Wallace Alexander Gerbode Foundation and The William and Flora Hewlett Foundation Choreographic Commission
- 2014 – ColumbusAlive.com named Sullivant Travels, by Stephan Koplowitz, Best Dance of 2014
- 2013 – Houston Press, awarded Natural Acts in Artificial Water, Best Ensemble Production of 2013
- 2010 – Distinguished Alumnus Award from the University of Utah
- 2007 Boston Globe named Koplowitz’ (iseea) one of the ten best dance works of 2007
- 2004 Alpert Award in the Arts
- 2003 Guggenheim Fellowship in Choreography
- 2003 Dance Theater Workshop’s Artist Resource and Media Laboratory Fellowship
- 2000 New York Dance and Performance Awards (“Bessie”)
- 1996 – Time Out Magazine’s Best Dance Production Award to Genesis Canyon
- 1994 – Distinguished Alumnus Award from Wesleyan University (class of 1979)

== Selected works ==
- 2018 The Beginning as part of The Northfield Experience
- 2018 Past the Past as part of The Northfield Experience
- 2018 Reading Time as part of The Northfield Experience
- 2018 The Northfield Experience (production) – Commissioned by St. Olaf and Carleton Colleges in association with the city of Northfield, Minnesota
- 2018 – Mill Town – Commissioned by the Bates Dance Festival
- 2017 – Occupy (a site-specific journey through an urban garden)Commissioned by the AXIS Dance Company, co-presented with the Dancers' Group and Yerba Buena Gardens Festival
- 2015 – Play(as) As part of Trolley Dances 2015, Commissioned by the San Diego Dance Theater
- 2014 – The Past is Up (Sullivant's Travels)
- 2014 – Horizon Time (Sullivant's Travels)
- 2014 – Learn, Capture, Repeat (Sullivant's Travels)
- 2014 – One Way: A Telematic Trio (Sullivant's Travels - A site-specific journey through the mind of a building-Commissioned by The Ohio State University Department of Dance and College of Arts and Sciences
- 2013 – Red Line Time, a site-adaptive durational performance for all fourteen stations of LA Metro’s Red Line
- 2013 – lines, tides, shores… A site-specific performance in three sections for the Cudahy Gardens, Milwaukee Art Museum
- 2013 – The Current Past, A site-specific performance for the North Point Water Tower, Milwaukee, WI
- 2012 – Natural Acts in Artificial Water, part of Stephan Koplowitz: TaskForce
- 2012 The Chair Yields Gustavus Adolphus College,
- 2012 in situ, Eckman Mall, Gustavus Adolphus College
- 2012 The Old New Thing for the Torrey Atrium, Warren & Donna Beck Academic Hall, Gustavus Adolphus College
- 2012 (Re)Fraction, A site-specific performance in lighted windows of Christ Chapel, Gustavus Adolphus College
- 2009 Taskforce: Liquid Landscapes UK
- 2008 Five Entrances into a War Machine
- 2008 Taskforce: Liquid Landscapes LA
- 2008 Taskforce: Mapping IdyllWild
- 2007 Revealed at Amherst
- 2007 iseea
- 2006 Revealed (NYC)
- 2006 A Walk Between Two Worlds
- 2005 Light Lines
- 2004 The Grand Step Project
- 2003 Terrarium
- 2001 (In)Formations
- 2000 Aquacade for Asphalt Green
- 1999 Kokerei Projekt: Kohle Korper
- 1999 Fenestrations2
- 1998 Babel Index
- 1998 War with the Newts
- 1997 Webbed Feats
- 1996 Genesis Canyon
- 1996 Off the Walls
- 1993 Thicker Than Water
- 1991 The Governed Body
- 1990 Fall Weather Friend
- 1989 Big Thirst
- 1987 Fenestrations
- 1986 Untitled (Ethiopia Suite)
- 1986 Famished
- 1985 I’m Growing
- 1983 – Heart Throb Theater
