= Norman Dorsen =

American lawyer (1930–2017)

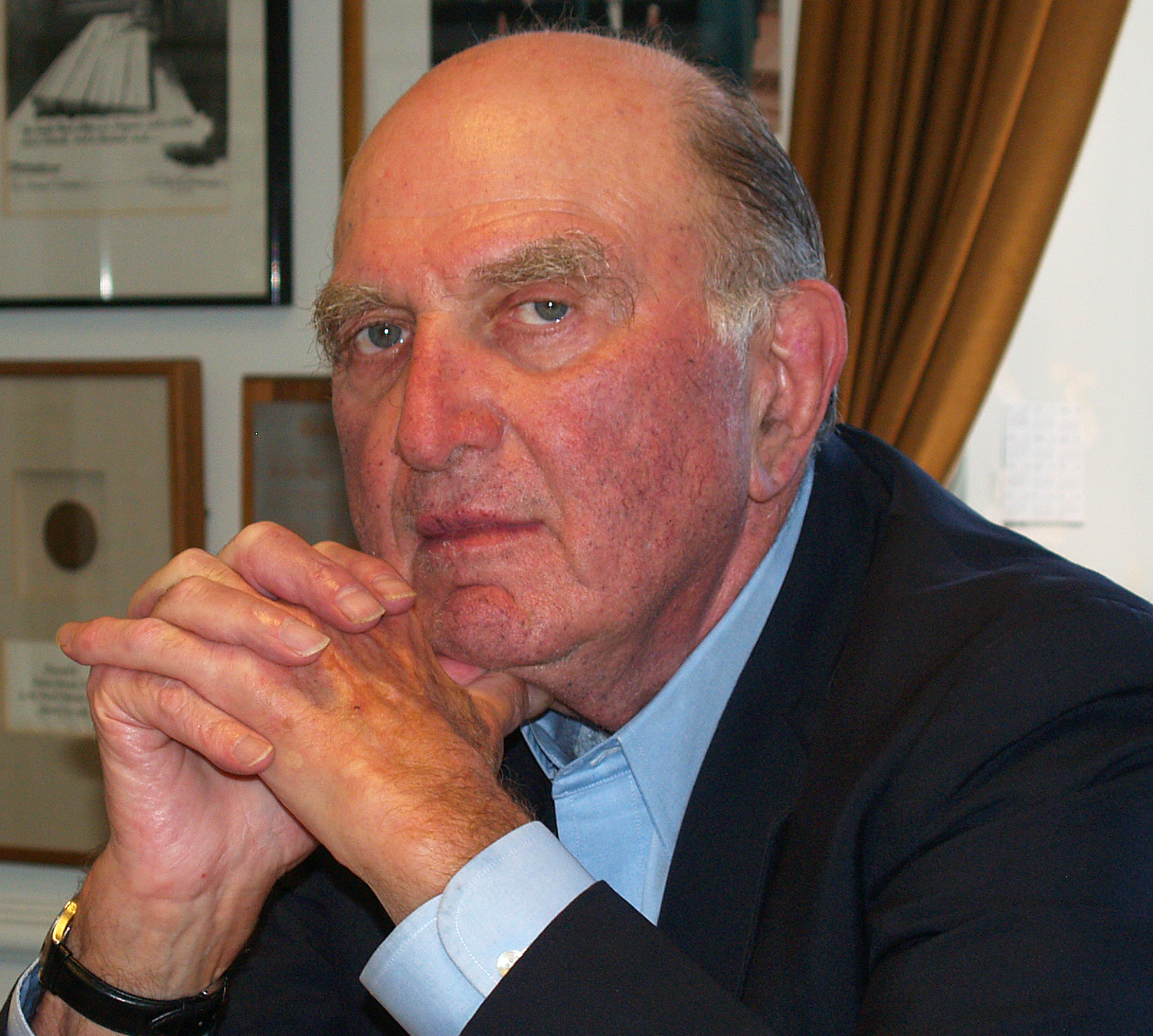
- Dorsen in 2007
- Born: September 4, 1930; Manhattan, New York, U.S.
- Died: July 1, 2017 (aged 86); Manhattan, New York, U.S.
- Education: Columbia University (BA); Harvard University (LLB)
- Scientific career
- Fields: Constitutional law
- Workplaces: New York University School of Law

Norman Dorsen (September 4, 1930 – July 1, 2017) was the Frederick I. and Grace A. Stokes Professor of Law and co-director of the Arthur Garfield Hays Civil Liberties Program at the New York University School of Law, where he specialized in Constitutional Law, Civil Liberties, and Comparative Constitutional Law. Previously, he was president of the American Civil Liberties Union, 1976–1991. He was also president of the Society of American Law Teachers, 1972–1973, and president of the U.S. Association of Constitutional Law in 2000.

Dorsen successfully argued the case of In re Gault, 387 U.S. 1 (1967), before the U.S. Supreme Court which held that juveniles accused of crimes in a delinquency proceeding must be afforded many of the same due process rights as adults.

He argued numerous cases before the Supreme Court, including Levy v. Louisiana (1968), ensuring equal protection for out-of-wedlock children, and United States v. Vuitch (1971), the first abortion case to reach the Court.

Dorsen sat on the Council on Foreign Relations, and was a Fellow of the American Academy of Arts and Sciences.

== Background ==
A 1950 graduate of Columbia College and 1953 graduate of Harvard Law School, Dorsen performed military service in the office of the Secretary of the Army fighting against McCarthyism in the Army-McCarthy Hearings. Dorsen clerked for Chief Judge Calvert Magruder of the U.S. Court of Appeals for the First Circuit and then Supreme Court Justice John Marshall Harlan II in the 1957 Term.

== Authorship ==
Dorsen authored numerous books, including Comparative Constitutionalism (2003 ISBN 0-314-24248-1), Our Endangered Rights (1984 ISBN 0-394-72229-9), and Frontiers of Civil Liberties (1968). His papers related to multiple aspects of the American civil liberties movement from the 1950s to the 1980s are housed in the Tamiment Library and Robert F. Wagner Labor Archives, New York University.

== Recognition ==
Among other honors, he received the Medal of Liberty from the French Minister of Justice in 1983 and the Eleanor Roosevelt Medal for contributions to human rights from Bill Clinton in 2000. In 2007, the Association of American Law Schools presented him with its first triennial award for "lifetime contributions to the law and to legal education."

In 2013, the ACLU established a new award in Norman Dorsen's honor, the Dorsen Presidential Prize, to be "presented biennially to a full-time academic for outstanding lifetime contributions to civil liberties."

== Personal life and death ==
Dorsen met his future wife, Harriette Koffler, at NYU and the couple married in 1965. They had three daughters, Jennifer Dorsen (an educator in Boston, MA), Caroline Dorsen (a professor at NYU) and Annie Dorsen (a writer and director). Harriette died in 2011. Dorsen owned a home in Cornwall, Connecticut.

Dorsen died at his Manhattan home on July 1, 2017, at age 86, of complications from a stroke.

== See also ==
- List of law clerks for the ninth seat of the Supreme Court of the United States
