= Mono No Aware (organization) =

US cinema-arts non-profit organization

MONO NO AWARE
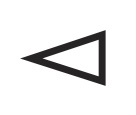
- Formation: 2007, New York City
- Founder: Steve Cossman
- Type: Non-Profit
- Purpose: Film Advocacy, Preservation, Distribution, Exhibition
- Headquarters: Brooklyn, New York
- Website: mononoawarefilm.com

Mono No Aware is a cinema-arts non-profit organization. Founded in 2007, its mission entails the advancement of “connectivity through the cinematic experience.” The organization is named after the Japanese concept mono no aware (物の哀れ), which expresses the impermanence of being and beauty.

Mono No Aware is based in Brooklyn, New York and organizes artist screenings, analog filmmaking workshops, equipment rentals, and film stock distribution. Film artists Bill Brand and Leslie Thornton serve on its Advisory Board. Since its founding, the organization has hosted an annual film festival, exhibiting expanded cinema works from around the world that utilize both analog technologies and live performance. Following the completion of the tenth festival, a month-long series of exhibitions, Mono No Aware undertook the construction of the first non-profit motion picture laboratory to operate in the United States.

== Annual film festival ==
In 2007, the first Mono No Aware film festival was held in the Galapagos Art Space in Brooklyn. It was free to attend and free to submit and the same holds true today. In 2016, the organization, in celebration of its tenth anniversary, organized MONO X, a 21-event film festival spanning three boroughs in New York City. It presented the work of 150 artists to an audience of 5,000. Works included sculpture, expanded cinema, and installation art incorporating the moving image on film and/or video. Presenting sponsors included Kodak, Brooklyn Brewery, and Technicolor.

=== Exhibition History ===
Year	Film	Format(s)	Artist(s)
2007	We are the Divided United	16mm & Live Sound	Huong Ngo & Emcee C.M.
2007	Light Sleep Walks	Super 8mm & Live Sound	Paul Clipson & Joshua Churchill
2007	Fireworks Film	16mm & Live Sound	Austin Willis
2007	#472 A	35mm & Live Sound	Nastya Osipova, Lea Bertucci, Ed Bear
2007	Happy Holidays	16mm & Live Sound	Steve Cossman & Matt Morandi
2008	Prenotions in Red, White, and Blues	16mm, Super 8mm, Live Sound	Fern Silva & Doron Sadja
2008	Architecture of the Sun	16mm & Live Sound	Brittany Gravely, Jennifer Pipp, The Glass Shivers
2008	Blush	Super 8mm	Sam Dishy
2008	Mekanikdolls	16mm, Super 8mm, Live Sound, Performance	Seyhan Muaoglu & Jess Ramsay
2009	El Ojo, La Boca, El Ano	16mm, 35mm Slide, Live Sound, Performance	Juan David Gonzalez Monroy & Julio Monterrey
2009	Etching With Light	Super 8mm & Live Sound	David Mason & John Davis
2009	Honeybed	Super 8mm, Live Sound, Performance	Syni Pappa, Myrto Karapiperi, Anna Maria Rammou
2009	Lunar Flare	Super 8mm & Live Sound	Julie Buck & Levi Rubeck
2009	Spillway Study/Carpe Diez	16mm & Performance	Ross Nugent
2009	Safe & Sound	Super 8mm & Live Sound	Rachael Rene Abernathy
2010	The Chinese Nightingale	Magic Lantern, Super 8mm, 16mm, 35mm, Performance	Bradley Eros, Lary Seven, Joel Schlemowitz, Victoria Keddie
2010	Youkali	16mm & Live Sound	Noe Kidder, Jessica Goldring, Mark Gallay
2010	Errata.Cinema	16mm, Live Sound, Performance	Thomas Dexter
2010	This Gives Me Fever at Night	16mm & Performance	Luis Arnias & Kim Ferero-Arnias
2010	UFO Evidence	16mm & Live Sound	Jason Martin
2010	You Know They Want to Disappear	Super 8mm & Live Sound	Stephanie Gray
2010	Spalms	16mm & Performance	Sarah Halpern & Matt Wellins
2010	Untitled	Super 8mm, 16mm, Performance	Jeremiah Jones, Ann Meisinger, Zane Starr, Kerry Farias
2010	Grandflower	16mm, Live Sound, Performance	Joshua Lewis, Danica Pantic, Joseph Stankus
2010	Catharsis	16mm Installation	Tara Nelson
2011	A Northern Portrait	16mm & Live Sound	Lindsay McIntyre
2011	Genesis	16mm & Live Sound	Edward Merton Casey
2011	The Proximity of Standing Stones	Super 8mm, 16mm, Live Sound	Monica Baptista & Robert Aki Aubrey Lowe
2011	The Colors of Spring	Super 8mm, 35mm Slide, Live Sound, Performance	Joey Huertas, Patricia Ordonez, Morgan Nance
2011	Half the Available Light in a Space	Performance	Luke Munn
2011	Monkey	16mm & Live Sound	Eric Ostrowski
2011	Glitch Envy	16mm & Performance	Jodie Mack
2011	Through the Headlights	Live Sound & Performance	Jasa Baka, Julia Thomas, Tyr Jami
2011	Under the BQE	Super 8mm & Live Sound	Alex Mallis & Hunter Simpson
2011	Tranquility #2 New York	16mm & Live Sound	Theodore King & Jordan Stone
2011	Still Already There	16mm & Live Sound	Alex Cunningham
2011	Harvest Moon	Super 8mm	Amanda Long
2012	IV Phases	16mm & Live Sound	Robert Howsare
2012	Selected Scenes Woven From Star Wars IV & V	Super 8mm & Installation	Mary Stark
2012	Expansion Contraction	16mm	Miro Hoffmann
2012	Bike-Cycle	Zoetrope Installation	Jodie Mack
2012	Measures	Super 8mm & Performance	Tara Nelson
2012	Je Ne Sais Plus (What is the Feeling)	16mm, Live Sound, Performance	Kristin Reeves
2012	Watershed / Surface Patterns	16mm, Live Sound, Performance	Mike Bonello & Man Forever
2012	Crusher	16mm, Live Sound, Performance	Steve Cossman & Ryan Marino
2012	Richard Gamble	Live Sound	Richard Gamble
2012	Ganzfeld Test	16mm & Sculpture	Amanda Long
2012	B-90 Noir	16mm & Live Sound	Johnny Rodgers
2012	Francesca Woodman's Aunts	16mm & Live Sound	Elina Brotherus
2012	Cementage	Super 8mm, 16mm, Live Sound	Masha Mitkov
2012	Where's the Child?	Super 8mm, Slide 35mm, Performance	Joey Huertas & Suzana Stankovic
2012	The Birds of Chernobyl	16mm & Live Sound	Margaret Rorison
2012	Will o' the Wisp	16mm, Live Sound, Performance	Kate Fleming, Sean Hanley, Charlie Adams, and others
2012	Jahiliyya Fields	Live Sound	Matthew Morandi
2013	Laser/Water	Light Installation	Juliette Dumas
2013	Infinitas Vias	Light Installation	Charlotte Becket
2013	Skinner #3	16mm Installation	Jae Song
2013	Light Box Collages	35mm, 16mm, Medium Format Photographic Installation	Mark Street
2013	Camera Paintings	16mm Installation	Joel Schlemowitz
2013	Let Your Light Shine	16mm	Jodie Mack
2013	Second Hermeneutic	16mm & Live Sound	Mike Morris
2013	The Telepathy Sessions	16mm, Live Sound, Performance	Brittany Gravely & Kenneth Linehan
2013	Tastefully Taut Against Germanium Satin	16mm & Live Sound	Bruce McClure
2013	Tape Measure Film	16mm Installation	Mary Stark
2013	RGB Fan	Light Installation	Johnny Rodgers
2013	SXO	Super 8mm, 35mm Slide, Live Sound	Chris Berntsen & Nick Klein
2013	52 Died	16mm & Live Sound	Eliseo Ortiz
2013	Rediscovering German Futurism	16mm, Live Sound, Performance	Kurt Ralske, Miriam Atkin, Daniel Carter
2013	Meshes	Super 8mm, Live Sound, Performance	Laura Bartczak, Paige Fredlund, Mark Demolar
2013	Zephyr	16mm & Live Sound	Sylvain Chaussée & Adrian Cook
2014	Crystal Image	Light Installation	Emmanuelle Negre
2014	Spore Film Loop Series	16mm Installation	Anna Scime
2014	Beyond a Shadow of a Form	Light & Sculpture Installation	Layne Hinton
2014	Cymantic Sun	Light Installation	Lachlan Turczan
2014	Island Arcadia	16mm & Live Sound	Emilie Lundstrom & Hunter Simpson
2014	Relieving the American Dream	16mm	Jodie Mack
2014	Second Hermeneutic	16mm & Live Sound	Charlotte Taylor & Robert Edmondson
2014	Chiratsuki	35mm Slide & Live Sound	Tomonari Nishikawa, Jeremy Young, Jesse Perlstein, Ian Temple
2014	Technicolor N.G.	Super 8mm, 16mm, 35mm Slide, Digital Installation	Tara Nelson & Gordon Nelson
2014	-+=OO.	16mm	Livia Santos, Andrei Moyssiadis, Dream Seed Group
2014	Bruce's Borders	16mm	Scott Fitzpatrick
2014	City 3	16mm & Live Sound	Sam Hoolihan & John Marks
2014	The Fish with Two Legs	16mm & Live Sound	Brian HK Oh, Maya Kuroki, Alexis Farand
2014	Memo	16mm & Live Sound	Krittin Patkuldilok, Hoshika Tachibana, Gabriela Gyorgeva, Alexandra Kocheva
2014	Surface Copernicus	Super 8mm & Live Sound	Kyle Corea, Patrick Scanlon, Stone Dow, Clint Hartzell
2014	Kannon, Goddess of Mercy	3D 16mm	Joel Schlemowitz
2014	Third Hermeneutic	16mm & Digital	Mike Morris
2015	Drifter	Light Installation & Sculpture	Charlotte Becket
2015	Still Life with Fries	16mm Installation	Rebecca Erin Moran
2015	The Clouds are not Like Either One	16mm Installation	Viktoria Schmid
2015	Eye Spoke Chorus	16mm & Live Sound	Timothy David Orme & Kir Jordan
2015	Grant Park	16mm & Live Sound	Robbie Land, Robert Pepper, Michael Durek, Amber Brien, Jon Worthley
2015	Harbour City	16mm & Live Sound	Simon Liu, Ben Hozie, Warren Ng
2015	Holland, Man.	16mm & Live Sound	Aaron Zeghers
2015	Vista	16mm & Live Sound	Sylvain Chaussé & Adrian Cook
2015	Faces	35mm Slide & Live Sound	Michael Newton & Vito Ricci
2015	Dreaming	Super 8mm & Performance	Stephanie Gould & Brighid Greene
2015	Two Aries	Super 8mm	Josh Weissbach
2015	Second Star	16mm & Live Sound	Scott Fitzpatrick
2015	Reflectors	16mm & Live Sound	John Marks, Crystal Myslajek, Sam Hoolihan
2015	Dog Year	16mm & Live Sound	Craig Scheihing, Christian Bach, Justin Fox, and others
2015	Night Visions	16mm & Live Sound	Zoe Kirk-Gushowaty
2016	The Circle, The Triangle, The Rectangle and the Crossing	3D 16mm Installation	Antonio Castles & Lucas Maia
2016	S1/S7	35mm Photographic Installation	Olya Zarapina
2016	Them Apples	16mm Installation	Adam Levine
2016	BadTransfer(ence)	16mm, Live Sound, Performance	Thomas Dexter
2016	Plane Wave	16mm	Daniel Robert Kelly
2016	Frente a Frente	16mm	Caitlin Diaz
2016	Se Busca (Missing)	16mm & Performance	Annalisa Quagliata
2016	Metamorphosis #1: Medusa's Children	16mm	Athena Washburn & Eli Neuman-Hammond
2016	Thisquietarmy x Philippe Leonard	16mm & Live Sound	Thisquietarmy & Philippe Leonard
2016	Even Silence is Cause of Storm	35mm slide & 16mm	Adriana Vila Guevara, Luic Macias, Alfredo Costa Montiero
2016	Mom's Tiger Lilies	Super 8mm	Kellie Bronikowski
2016	Red Wing, Black Bird	16mm & Live Sound	Erika Jane Barrett
2016	Change	16mm & Live Sound	Lily Jue Sheng & Michael Sidnam
2016	Spectrum States	16mm & Live Sound	Joshua Churchill, Paul Clipson, John Davis
2016	Highview	16mm & Live Sound	Simon Liu, Warren Ng, Ben Hozie
2016	Zone Four	16mm & Live Sound	Noe Kidder & Mark Gallay
2018	Birthday	Super 8mm & Performance	Nikki Calonge, Michael De Angelis, Eva Peskin
2018	Appetite	Super 8mm & Performance	Laurel Atwell
2018	Evenings	Super 8mm & Performance	Stephanie Gould
2018	Chasing Trains	Super 8mm & Performance	Jason Bernard Lucas
2018	Lung-ta of Film, The Face of the Other, In Beauty May You Walk	16mm, 35mm, Video, Installation, Performance, Live Sound	Manoshi Chitra Neogy, Xuezi Zhang, Scott Endsley
2018	Fire (RGB)	16mm Installation	Viktoria Schmid
2018	Exquisite Corpse, Movement in Five Parts	16mm Installation	Trevor Tweeten
2018	Untitled Still Life	16mm Installation	Rebecca Erin Moran
2018	Parasitic Oscillation	Super 8mm & Live Sound	Bryan Ratigan & Edward Paul Quist
2018	Cine間(ma)-Absence Triggered by a Third Body	Super 8mm & Performance	Tetsuya Maruyama
2018	Lydon	16mm	Lucy Kerr
2018	Hamood in America	16mm & Performance	Saif Al-Sobaihi, Moe Kamal, Ryan Hance
2018	Solo Duet	Super 8mm & Performance	Laura Bartczak
2018	63 Acres: Dear Danny Lyon	Super 8mm & Live Sound	Stephanie Gray
2018	From Day to Night	16mm & Live Sound	Robert Orlowski & David Shapiro
2018	Golem Rite	16mm & Performance	Mary Lewandowski & Nilson Carroll
2018	Desaparcer / Disappear	16mm & Performance	Elena Pardo, Manuel Trujillo, Javier Lara
2018	Stasis & Motion	16mm & Performance	John Marks, Crystal Myslajek, Sam Hoolihan
2018	Lovemoon Battlefield	16mm & Performance	Alex Cunningham
2018	A Chorus of Black Voids Sings in Rays of Unseeable Light	16mm & Performance	Michael Morris
2018	Rapt	16mm & Live Sound	Melissa Cha
2018	Who You Give Your Heart To	16mm & Live Sound	Phoebe Collings-James
2018	What's the Meaning of This?	16mm & Live Sound	Pimo
2018	Motion at a Distance	16mm & Live Sound	Lindsay Packer & Andrew Kong Hoon Lee
2022	The Meadows	16mm Animation	Maya Edelman
2022	For Cynthia	16mm Animation	Nora Rodriguez
2022	Stepping into the Frame	16mm Tripple Projection	Lauren Noelle Oliver
2022	Beam	16mm Dual Projection	Blinn & Lambert
2022	Birthday Song	16mm Installation	Erica Sheu
2022	Coal	16mm Installation	Janika Herlevi
2022	Three Faces Scratched in Cloth	16mm Tripple Projection	Peaches Goodrich
2022	And so She Works...From Home...As Does She	16mm Dual Projection	Simone Barros
2022	Three Cities Winter '19	16mm Projection & Live Sound	Connor Kramerer
2022	Dust in The Wind	35mm Slide Projection & Live Sound	Hsuan-Kuang Hsieh
2022	The Folly	16mm Projection & Live Sound	Hasabie Kidanu
2022	Pulsos Subterraneos/Underground Pulses	16mm Multi Projection & Live Sound	Elena Pardo, Millie Wissar & Misha Marks
2022	The Mushroom Archive	16mm Multi Projection & Live Sound	Optipus
2022	Touching the Rumble of Melting	16mm Projection	Nung-Hsin Hu
2022	Everything Comes Full Circle	16mm Installation	Lilan Yang
2022	Into the Night	Kinetic Sculpture	Ray Chang
2022	Mere Dil Mere Musaafir	16mm Projection & Live Sound	Julia Zanin De Paula & Iman Selachii
2022	When the Seeds say Enough	S8mm Dual Projection & Live Sound	Dominick Rivers
2022	Nowadays	Multi Format Multi Projection	Tessa Hughes-Freeland & Mark Abramson
2022	Devotion	16mm Projection & Live Sound	Sara Scur & Hugo Wai
2022	The Lovesick Serpent	16mm Projection & Live Sound	Chae Yu
2022	Content Warning	16mm Projection & Performance	Ayanna Dozier
2022	The Seven Sins of Memory	16mm Multi Projection & Performance	IEVA BALODE & MAKSIMS ŠENTEĻEVS
2022	Deprivation	16mm Film	Caity Arthur (Director)

== Educational Initiatives ==
Mono No Aware runs workshops in Brooklyn year-round, and collaborates with institutions throughout North America, to teach students analog filmmaking techniques. Workshops include non-toxic film processing with coffee and beer, hand-making photographic emulsion, 2D and 3D analog animation, optical printing and contact printing, and Super 8mm, 16mm, and 35mm filmmaking.

== See also ==
- Mono no aware
