= Nia Love =

American dancer and choreographer

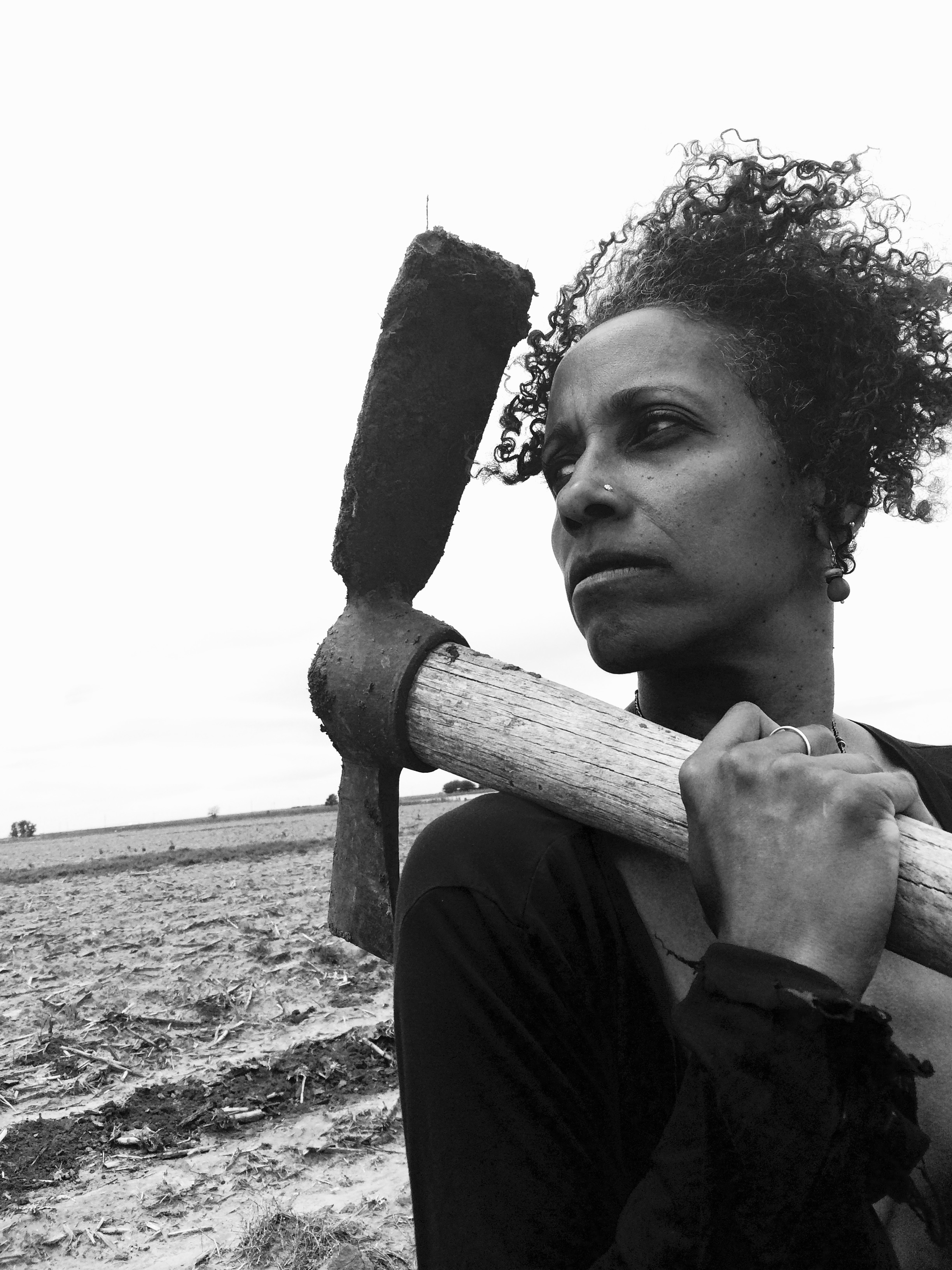

Nia Love is a dancer and choreographer based in New York City and a professor of dance at Florida State University. She is a radical thinker, artist, performer and professor that focuses on Modern dance, Post-Modern dance, and West African dance. She is known for her spiritual relationships to movement and performance, as well as her personal work that is critical of structural racism and examines the role of women in dance through her poetry, movement and art.

== Early life and inspiration ==
Love was raised in Florida, where her father Ed was a professor at Florida State University (FSU). Love apprenticed with the Cuban National Ballet in Havana, Cuba in 1978 and 1986. She received her MFA in Dance at FSU in 1992. Love's dance style draws inspiration from Butoh, Modern dance forms, and traditional African dance. While at FSU, she integrated live drumming into her classes and performances. Regarding her work's individuality, she has cited inspiration from her father and her emphasis on family, as well as traditional Japanese dance influences, having studied Butoh under Min Tanaka.

== Teaching ==
In the early 1990s, Love taught an Alternative Learning Program in the Arts with a focus on African culture in Los Angeles. Since then, Love has taught through many programs and institutions, such as: American Dance Festival, Smith College, Williams College, Sarah Lawrence College, Hunter College, University of Colorado, Movement Research, and Bates Dance Festival. She currently teaches at Queens College, Hunter College, and The New School. Nia Love is presently a full time associate professor at Florida State University's School of Dance.

== List of choreographed works ==
- Ye Who Seeks Balance in the Midst of Chaos Shall Rise to a Warrior's Stance - 1990
- Pow - 1993
- Listen, Little Man - 1994
- Wind at My Back - 1995
- Bringing' It Together - 2001
- No Dancing Please! - 2001
- Residue - 2001
- g1(host): lostatsea - 2019

== Fellowships and awards ==
- Fulbright Fellow - 2001 to 2003
- Brooklyn Arts Exchange Artist in Residence - 2011 to 2012, 2013 to 2014
- Suitcase Fund Award/African - 2013 to 2014
- Middle East Cultural Partnership - 2013 to 2014
- New Directions Choreographic Laboratory - 2013 to 2014
- CUNY Dance Initiative - 2014 to 2015
- Movement Research Artist in Residence - 2016
- The Bessie Award - 2017
