= Annie Dorsen =

American theater director

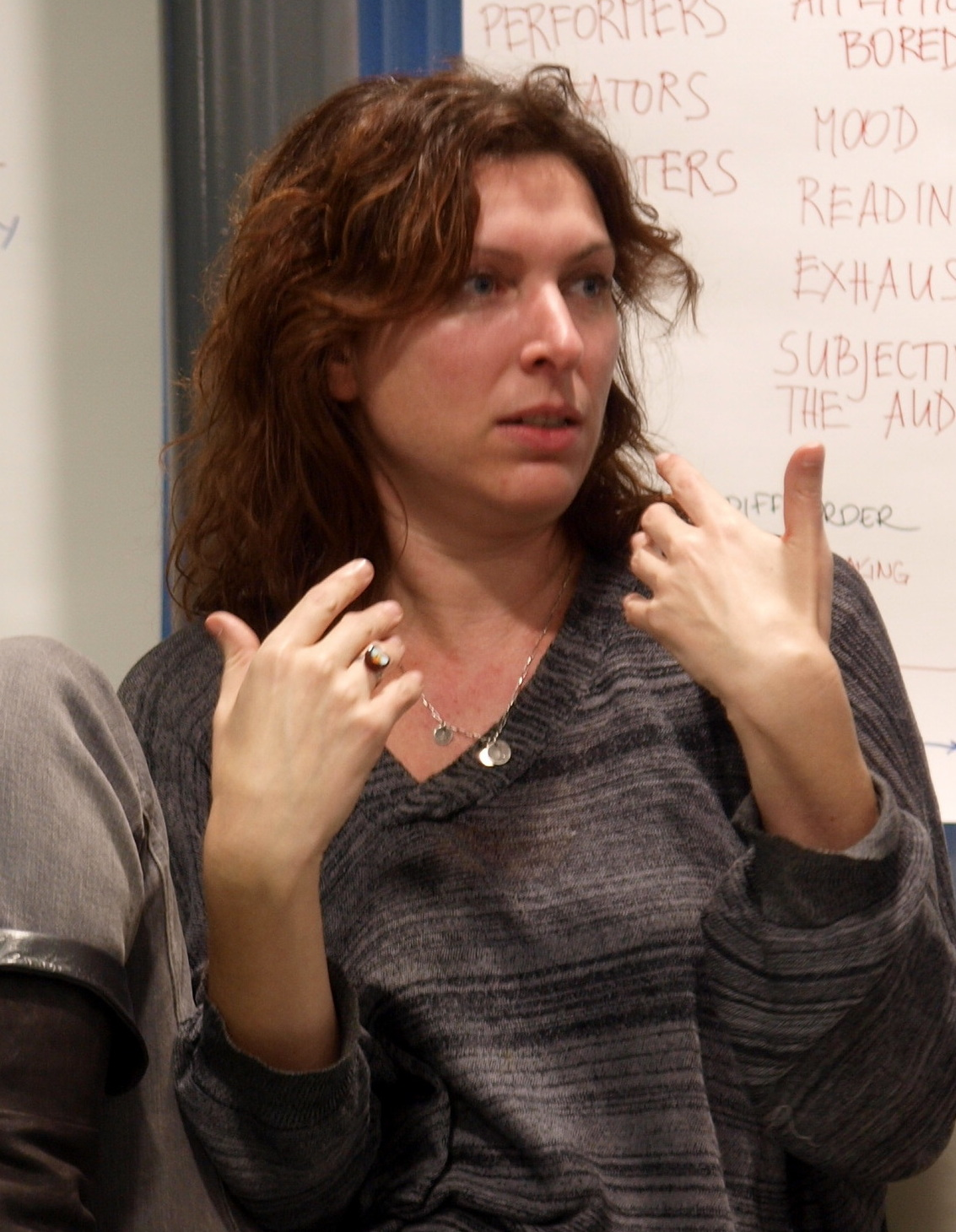
- Dorsen in 2010
- Born: 1973 (age 52–53); New York City
- Education: Yale University, Yale School of Drama
- Occupations: Playwright, director
- Father: Norman Dorsen
- Awards: Alpert Award in the Arts; Guggenheim Fellowship; MacArthur Fellowship

Annie Dorsen (born 1973) is an American theater director. She is the co-creator and director of the Broadway musical Passing Strange, and her work in "algorithmic theater" includes the plays Hello Hi There, A Piece of Work, and Yesterday Tomorrow. Dorsen has received an Alpert Award in the Arts, a Guggenheim Fellowship and a MacArthur Fellowship.

== Early life and education ==
Dorsen was born in 1973 in New York City to Harriette and Norman Dorsen. She has two sisters: Jennifer, who is an educator in Boston, and Caroline, a public health scholar and educator who studies psychedelic drug use and is a professor at NYU .

She graduated with a BA degree from Yale University in 1996, and received an MFA degree from Yale School of Drama in 2000. She also holds a J.D. from NYU School of Law, where she focused on tech policy and civil rights. She attended the Brearley School in NYC and Milton Academy.

== Career ==
In collaboration with Heidi Rodewald and Stew, Dorsen created and directed the rock musical Passing Strange, a semi-fictional story about Stew's life that was co-commissioned by Berkeley Repertory Theatre and The Public Theater. The show opened Off-Broadway at The Public Theater in 2007, and had its Broadway premiere at the Belasco Theatre in 2008. While Passing Strange was running on Broadway, Dorsen also created Democracy in America, an Off-Broadway satire of American politics and polling, in which anyone could pay a fee to add their own material to the script being performed.

Dorsen has collaborated with computer programmers to produce "algorithmic theater" in which custom algorithms process source material to generate live scripts and scores that are performed by chatbots and human actors. Her first piece of "algorithmic theater" was Hello Hi There, in which chatbots use text from the Chomsky–Foucault debate, the works of William Shakespeare, the Bible, and YouTube comments to create unique dialogue for each performance. In the five-act play A Piece of Work, chatbots and a human actor perform a script created in real-time by processing the text of Hamlet. Yesterday Tomorrow, the final piece in Dorsen's trilogy of algorithmic performances, uses custom algorithms to produce a live score, performed by three singers, that transitions from the Beatles song "Yesterday" to the song "Tomorrow" from the musical Annie.

In 2017, Dorsen received a grant from the Foundation for Contemporary Arts to support her play The Great Outdoors, in which audience members lie down inside an inflatable planetarium and listen to a human performer read recent Internet comments selected and processed by an algorithm. A year later, Dorsen received the Spalding Gray Award, which provided funds to produce her play The Slow Room. The play, a human performance of a fixed script assembled from virtual sex chat room messages, premiered later that year at Performance Space New York.

== Recognition ==
Dorsen received one of the 2014 Alpert Awards in the Arts, which recognize the work of experimental artists by providing a US$75,000 prize to each recipient. In 2018, she received a Guggenheim Fellowship. The following year she received a MacArthur Fellowship. She was one of six MacArthur fellows from New York City.
