= Hirotaka Uchizono =

Japanese footballer

Personal information
- Full name: Hirotaka Uchizono
- Date of birth: 27 April 1987 (age 39)
- Place of birth: Ibusuki, Kagoshima, Japan
- Height: 1.80 m (5 ft 11 in)
- Position: Midfielder

Youth career
- 2006–2009: Tokai Gakuen University

Senior career*
Years	Team	Apps	(Gls)
2009	FC Kariya	10	(0)
2010–2013	FC Kagoshima	25	(3)
2014–2017	Kagoshima United FC	47	(1)
2017–2023	Tegevajaro Miyazaki	66	(0)
Total		148	(4)
- * Club domestic league appearances and goals as of 19 January 2024 @ 06:06(AEST)

Hirotaka Uchizono (内薗大貴, Uchizono, Hirotaka; born 27 April 1987 in Ibusuki, Kagoshima) is a former Japanese footballer.

Updated to 23 February 2017.

Club performance			League		Cup		Total	
Season	Club	League	Apps	Goals	Apps	Goals	Apps	Goals
Japan			League		Emperor's Cup		Total	
2009	FC Kariya	JFL	10	0	1	0	11	0
2010	FC Kagoshima	Kagoshima State League						
2011	FC Kagoshima	JFL (Kyushu)	0	0	1	0	0	0
2012	FC Kagoshima	JFL (Kyushu)	18	2	–		18	2
2013	FC Kagoshima	JFL (Kyushu)	7	1	–		7	1
2014	Kagoshima United FC	JFL	22	1	2	0	24	1
2015	Kagoshima United FC	JFL	20	0	0	0	20	0
2016	Kagoshima United FC	J3 League	3	0	0	0	3	0
Career total			80	4	4	0	84	4
