= Azza El Siddique =

Sudanese-Canadian artist (born 1984)

Azza El Siddique (Arabic: عزة الصديق, born 1984) is a Sudanese-Canadian artist who lives and works in Toronto, Canada and New Haven, Connecticut. She is known for creating multi-sensory sculptural installations. El Siddique holds a Master of Fine Arts from Yale University (2019), and a Bachelor of Fine Arts from OCAD University (2014).

== Life and career ==
El Siddique was born in Khartoum, Sudan, and her family emigrated to Vancouver, British Columbia when she was four years old. She moved to Toronto, Ontario, Canada, as a student and initially planned to study fashion design at Toronto Metropolitan University, but decided to enroll at Ontario College of Art & Design University instead. She received a Bachelor of Fine Arts in Material Art and Design in 2014.

She moved to New Haven, Connecticut, to attend Yale University and earned a Master of Fine Arts in Sculpture in 2019.

== Style ==
El Siddique's work explores themes of power, temporality, memory, identity, and place, often drawing inspiration from ancient Egyptian and Nubian mythology. She incorporates materials such as clay, scented oils, metal, water, light, and smoke. She also considers gravity and time as elements in her work.

Her work has been exhibited in cities including Vancouver, New York, Montreal, Buffalo, Toronto, Miami, and New Haven.

== Work and exhibitions ==
=== Selected works ===
Lattice Be Transparent, presented at 8eleven Gallery in Toronto, consisted of large sculptural works made of fabric, plastic, water, string, glass, cinder blocks, clay, and other materials.

El Siddique's 2023 installation that which trembles waves at Bradley Ertaskiran in Montreal reflected her interest in Egyptian and Nubian mythology, and featured a large double-headed porcelain cobra bound by metal scaffolding. During the exhibition, water dripped onto the installation, causing corrosion over time, while the environment was enhanced by heat-activated sandalwood perfumery.

=== Selected group exhibitions ===
El Siddique has participated in more than 20 group exhibitions in Canada and internationally.

In 2019, El Siddique's work was included in Material Tells at Oakville Galleries (Toronto), Too Full to Cry at Shin Gallery (New York), Ripe at Dawn at Green Hall Gallery (New Haven), and NADA Miami.

For the show fire is love, water is sorrow (2021), El Siddique exhibited her work alongside that of her late brother Teto El Siddique (1982–2017), displaying Teto's paintings alongside a large metal scaffold, often exposing both the front and back of the works. Along with the scaffolding, El Siddique created metal canvases with soldered designs as counterparts to her brother's paintings. One of these canvases, One washes the other, was shown independently at Charles Moffett Gallery's "Genius Loci" (2023) in New York, which featured artists from around the world.

In 2021, El Siddique participated in MOCA's Greater Toronto Art 2021 in its inaugural iteration, which highlights contemporary artists working in the greater Toronto area.

In 2024, El Siddique took part in Aporia: Notes to a Medium at the Morris and Helen Belkin Art Gallery, which explored the role of doubt in contemporary societies.

== Awards and grants ==
El Siddique's project The Edifice of Tirhaga Pt. I (ongoing as of 2024) is funded by Creative Capital, a non-profit organization based in New York City. The project transforms El Siddique's late brother's pickup truck into a "mobile public sculpture," connecting it to Egyptian funerary rites, a recurring theme in her work, and the combination of ancient and modern technology.

=== Residencies ===
In 2021, El Siddique was a resident artist at Amant, a non-profit art gallery in Brooklyn, NY, where she conducted archival research on Egyptian perfumery.

In 2022, she was a resident artist at John Michael Kohler Arts Center, where she worked on sculptural projects. In 2025, she was awarded a Guggenheim Fellowship.

El Siddique's other residencies have included Silver Art Project (2020), The Lighthouse Works Fellowship (2019), Harbourfront Centre (2014–2017), and the Chautauqua School of Arts (2014).
