= Robin Frohardt =

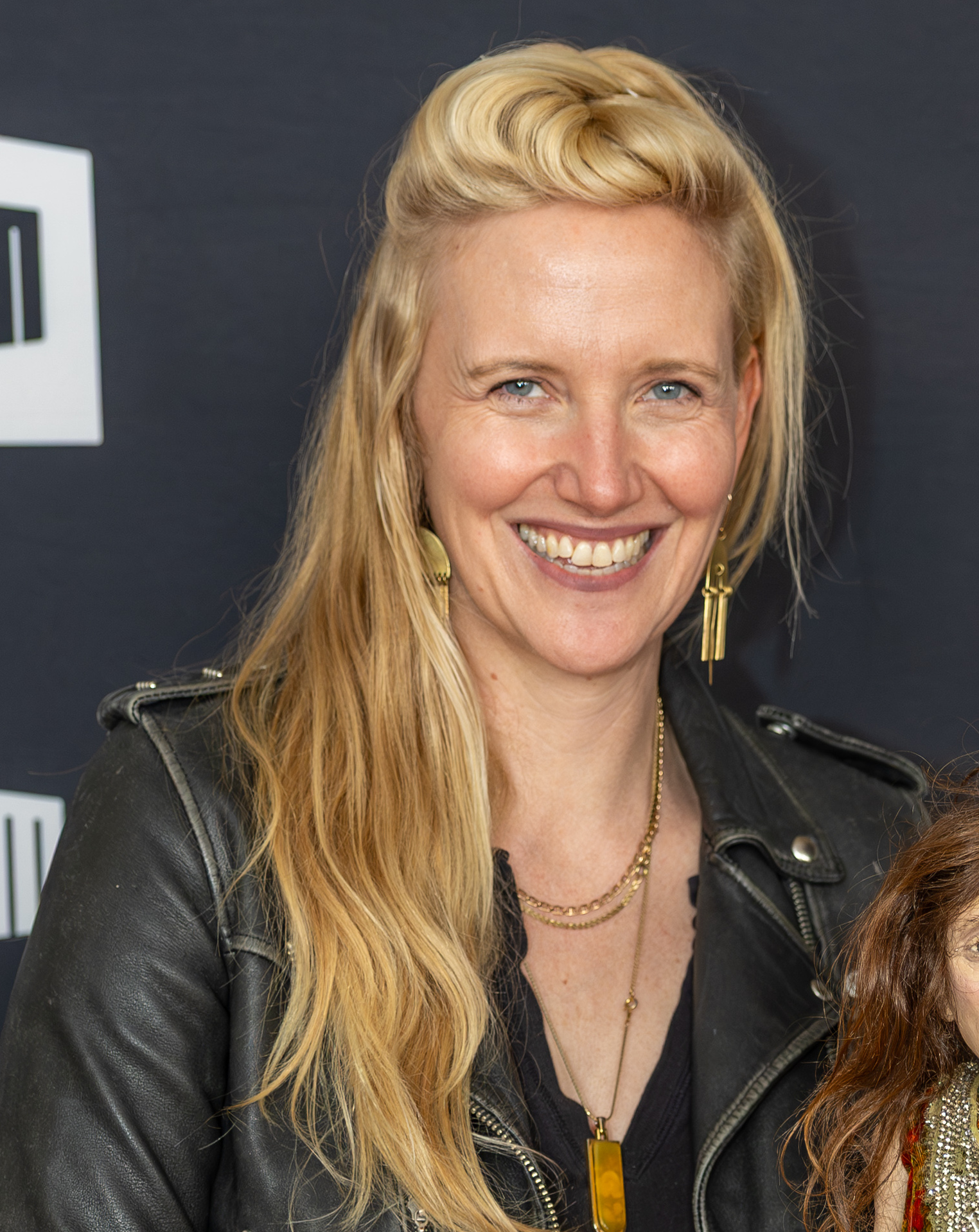
- Frohardt at SFFILM in 2026
- Known for: puppet design, playwright
- Movement: social practice art, environmentalism
- Website: robinfrohardt.com

Robin Frohardt is an American playwright, puppet designer, visual artist, and director based in Brooklyn, NY.

== Career ==
Frohardt constructs her sets for films and plays completely from cardboard. She also uses plastic, wood, cloth, and other recycled materials to make puppets and installations. Some of her puppets are realistic people while other objects take abstract forms. Frohardt uses Bunraku-style puppetry, most notably in her show The Pigeoning. Bunraku is a traditional Japanese form of performance that involves puppeteers, chanters, and musicians.

Environmentalism is the primary theme in Frohardt’s work, specifically in Bag Movie, The Plastic Bag Store, and Dumpster Monster, which all focus on the prevalence and permanence of human waste.

== Work ==
=== Major exhibitions ===
The Plastic Bag Store is an installation in the form of a fully stocked grocery store. Created to look realistic, all products are hand crafted from single-use plastic. This exhibition transformed into a three act live puppet performance at night with original music by Freddi Price. The theme is that humans can never really throw away trash. She tells the journey of plastic waste, and criticizes mass consumption. The Plastic Bag Store was awarded the Creative Capital Award in 2016 and before COVID-19 was scheduled to reappear in March 2020 in Times Square.

The Pigeoning is a puppet show that debuted at HERE Arts Center in 2013 about an obsessively clean office worker who believes that pigeons are plotting against him. It won the Arlyn Award in 2014 for Outstanding Design in Puppet Theater and was nominated for the Drama Desk Award for Best Music in a Play for its original music by Freddi Price. Dumpster Monster is a 10-minute puppet performance including audience participation centered around a creature constructed entirely of trash that explodes from a dumpster. It debuted in 2015 at The Clarice Smith Performing Arts Center.

=== Collaborations ===
Frohardt created puppets for Anna Fitch and Banker White’s documentary film Heaven Through the Backdoor. She designed the sets for Nick Jones’s play Jollyship the Whizbang. She worked on the additional set pieces for a theater piece on the subway titled IRT: A Tragedy in Three Stations by Jeff Stark. She designed the snack bar and ticket booth for Jeff Stark and Todd Chandler’s installation Empire Drive-In. She was a puppet designer for the play Salt of the Earth by Zvi Sahar. Frodardt worked with Dream Community as a director and creator of floats, costumes, and puppets in the Dream Parade in Taipei, Taiwan. She designed puppets for the New York and Norway based puppet company Wakka Wakka.

=== Other experience ===
Along with other artists Kirk Lombard, Freddi Price, Ben Burke, Jesse Roadkill, Duskin Drum, and Caryl Keintz, Frohardt founded Apocalypse Puppet Theater which ran from 2005 to 2010. The artists built puppets and wrote plays for the mobile theater that ran out of a wagon pulled by bikes. Frohardt worked with the Cardboard Institute of Technology from 2008 to 2012 to make cardboard installations.

=== Awards and honors ===
- 2019, Made In NY Women’s Fund Grant Award
- 2018, Guggenheim Fellowship
- 2016, DisTIL Fellowship at UNC
- 2016, Olson Kundig Artist in Residence
- 2016, Creative Capital Award for “The Plastic Bag Store”
- 2016, Jim Henson Foundation Project Grant
- 2016, Residency at The MacDowell Colony
- 2016, Jim Henson Foundation Seed Grant for “The Plastic Bag Store”
- 2014, Mid-Atlantic Arts Fund USArtists International Grant Award
- 2014, Arlyn Award for Puppet Design for “The Pigeoning”
- 2013, Peggy Irvine Foundation Award for Artistic Excellence
- 2013, Artist in Residence St. Anne’s Warehouse’s Puppet Lab
- 2012, Jim Henson Foundation Project Grant for “The Pigeoning”
- 2012, Artist in Residence at HERE Arts “Dream Music Puppetry” Program
- 2011, Artist in Residence St. Anne’s Warehouse’s Puppet Lab
