= Leslie Thornton (filmmaker) =

American filmmaker (born 1951)

Leslie Thornton (born 1951) is an American avant-garde filmmaker and artist.

== Life ==
Leslie Thornton was born in 1951 in Knoxville, Tennessee, and grew up in Oak Ridge, Tennessee, and Schenectady, New York. Both her father and grandfather worked on the Manhattan Project, but due to the project's high level of secrecy, neither knew of the other's involvement until many years later. Thornton learned as an adult, and as a result the atomic bomb and themes of apocalypse appear in some of her works (most notably, Peggy and Fred in Hell and Let Me Count the Ways, Minus 10, 9, 8, and 7...). She first developed an interest in film as a teenager when she frequented experimental cinema screenings at her local Unitarian Church in Schenectady. Attending Tufts University as an undergraduate from 1969 until 1971, Thornton then transferred to the State University of New York at Buffalo where she studied painting under Seymour Drumlevitch and film under Hollis Frampton, Paul Sharits, Stan Brakhage, and Peter Kubelka. After earning a Bachelor of Fine Arts in painting at SUNY-Buffalo in 1973, she continued on to graduate work. Thornton earned a Master of Fine Arts in Painting from The Hartford Art School in 1976, and then studied film at the graduate level at the Massachusetts Institute of Technology in 1975 under Richard Leacock and Ed Pincus. Currently she works as a professor of Modern Culture and Media at Brown University and teaches at the European Graduate School. She lives in both Providence, Rhode Island, and New York City with her partner, artist and scholar Thomas Zummer.

== Style ==
Thornton began painting as a teenager, during "a period of Minimalism moving into Conceptualism." She recalls that lineage as a prominent part of her own work, where visually, "The paintings were moving towards white but there was some kind of grid that kept being laid down and re-established." Scholar Thomas Zummer characterizes those early paintings through their grids: "Thornton's paintings organized a sensual, expressionist hand into strict formal geometric mappings. These works begin with a painterly sensuality set within and against a series of structural grids, so that there is a constant between expressivity and the ineffable." But as her practice developed, he notes, "Painting was a vessel incapable of the containment of the sensate. Language, gesture, emotion the random and inexplicable things and occurrences of the world were among her subjects; painting seemed insufficient. It was a matter of finding an appropriate instrument for her investigations". Painting's insufficiency led Thornton to her first venture in filmmaking, X-TRACTS, in 1975 while studying painting at the Hartford School of Art (though she was familiar with film theory from her undergraduate coursework at SUNY-Buffalo). After graduating, she abandoned painting in favor of filmmaking, which felt to her, despite Zummer's claims, entirely unrelated to her previous practice: "I dropped thinking of what I had been doing with painting once I started the process of making film. I didn't draw comparisons though I probably could now, if I thought about it." Filmmaking has dominated her work since this transition, though she recently began painting again as a hobby.

Thornton's filmography includes 16mm, video, HD video, HDV, digital video and 2K video. Employing archival materials, text, found footage and soundtrack, the body of work as a whole explores themes of language, childhood, nuclear war, technology, ethnography, seriality and narrative structure. These themes have been collectively described as "an investigation in the production of meaning through media." In her words, "I see myself as writing with media, and I position the viewer as an active reader, not a consumer. The goal is not a product, but shared thought." Throughout her career, Thornton has received significant critical acclaim for her work—particularly for her serial Peggy and Fred in Hell, and was the only woman experimental filmmaker included in Cahiers du cinéma's "60 Most Important American Directors" issue. In addition to acclaim from critics, Thornton has received many awards and her work is included in the collections of many museums.

== Peggy and Fred in Hell ==
Thornton's first widely-recognized and perhaps still best-known work is the epic serial Peggy and Fred in Hell. The project began as she was moving into a new apartment in San Francisco and the two children who lived upstairs, Janis and Donald Reading, came to offer help. While carrying her things, they saw the film equipment and wanted to be recorded (the resulting material would eventually become part of the serial's first episode, Peggy and Fred in Hell: The Prologue). Thornton immediately fell in love with their performance and chose them as the protagonists for her then-upcoming Peggy and Fred in Hell. In a 1990 essay that acts as a descriptive companion to the serial, "We Ground Things, Now, On a Moving Earth", Thornton describes the premise where a camera tracks two children "raised by television" who live in a "post-apocalyptic splendor," "adrift in the detritus of prior cultures." These children, Peggy and Fred, wander through Hell (filmed primarily in California, but also across the United States) and fill their time learning "how to make avocado dip, getting lost in their own house, receiving imaginary phone calls and death threats, deciding what things are for," and monitoring the television sets that fill their homes. Though the Readings' performances before the camera are unscripted, Thornton provides them with "a fictional construct…having been told only their names, that they are adults, that this is their house, that they are hungry.” The conditions result in improvisations that Thornton calls "a true interaction in a fictionalized environment." Recorded between 1981 and 1988, the footage of the children was then taken to the editing room where Thornton spliced their improvisations with archival materials, including but not limited to creation myths recorded by Franz Boas, excerpts from the Bible, outtakes from Universal newsreels, B-roll of factories from the Industrial Revolution, Thomas Edison’s archive, raw footage from the Moon landing, and weather radar tapes.

The resulting works were released between 1984 and 2013 in a series of 17 episodes, which range in time from two to 20 minutes each, in format from 16 mm film to analog video to digital video, and are almost entirely in black and white with the exception of a short clip in from the 1996 episode Whirling. Later episodes introduced a variety of digital effects, including text crawls, graphic overlays, and rippling images. Thornton emphasizes the serial's "modular format," and encourages that the episodes be played in any order or simultaneously. The themes in the serial as a whole include science fiction, ethnography, language acquisition, narrative form, the convergence of technology and the human consciousness, and the history of American cinema. She referred to the project as "ongoing and open-ended" until the release of The Fold in 2013.

Critics have praised Peggy and Fred in Hell since its beginning in 1984. Both The Village Voice and Cahiers du Cinéma placed the serial on their "Best Films of the Year: 1989" lists, and Senses of Cinema included it on their "50 Best films of 2004" (for the version Peggy and Fred in Hell: Beginning, Middle, End). The Pacific Film Archive began a restoration of a final-cut iteration of the serial in 2008. Film critic Jonathan Rosenbaum, who has praised Thornton's work elsewhere, called Peggy and Fred in Hell both "highly idiosyncratic and deeply creepy," and "the most exciting recent work in the American avant-garde, a saga that raises questions about everything while making everything seem very strange."

== Filmography ==
Legend	Part of Peggy and Fred in Hell

Year	Title	Format	Length	
1974	Face	S-8mm	10 minutes	Color; silent
1975	X-TRACTS	16mm	9 minutes	Black-and-white
1976	All Right You Guys	16mm	16 minutes	Black-and-white
1977	Howard	16mm	30 minutes	Black-and-white
1977	Fiddlers in May	16mm	28 minutes	Color; produced for CPTV
1979	Minutiae	16mm	55 minutes	Color
1981	noexitkiddo	16mm	30 minutes	Color
1981	Jennifer, Where Are You?	16mm	10 minutes	Color
1983	Oh, China, Oh	16mm	3 minutes	Black-and-white
1984	Peggy and Fred in Hell: The Prologue	16mm	21 minutes	Black-and-White
1987	1,001 Eyes	Multimedia	Installation	
1987	She Had He So He Do He To Her	16mm	5 minutes	Color
1987	Peggy and Fred in Kansas	16mm; video	11 minutes	Black-and-white
1988	There Was An Unseen Cloud Moving	Video	60 minutes	Color
1988	Peggy and Fred and Pete	Video	23 minutes	Sepia; black-and-white
1989	[Dung Smoke Enters The Palace]	16mm; video	16 minutes	Black-and-white
1993	Introduction to the So-Called Duck Factory	16mm; video	7 minutes	Black-and-white
1993	Strange Space	Video	4 minutes	Color; co-produced with Ron Vawter
1994	The Last Time I Saw Ron	Video	12 minutes	Color
1996	Whirling	16mm	2 minutes	Black-and-white
1996	The Problem So Far	16mm; video	7 minutes	Black-and-white
1996	Old Worldy	Video	30 minutes	Black-and-White
1997	...or lost	16mm	7 minutes	Color
1998	The Haunted Swing	Video	16 minutes	Color
1999	Another Worldy	16mm	24 minutes	Color
1999	Chimp For Normal Short	16mm	7 minutes	Sepia
2000	Bedtime	Video	4 minutes	Black-and-White
2000	Quickly, Yet Too Slowly	Multimedia	Installation	Installation (in Presumés Innocent, Musée d'art contemporain de Bordeaux, France, June 8-October 1, 2000)
2001	Have a Nice Day Alone	16mm; video	7 minutes	Black-and-White
2001	The Splendor	Video	2 minutes	Black-and-White
2002	Document of an Installation	Video	6 minutes	Black-and-White; color
2002	Bedtime v.2	Video	7 minutes	Black-and-White
2002	Peggy and Fred on Television	Video	Single channel variant; 105 minutes	Black-and-White; color; sepia
2002	The 10,000 Hills of Language	Multimedia	Installation	Installation
2003	Paradise Crushed	Video	7 minutes	Black-and-White
2003	Origin	Video	4 minutes	Color
2003	Temporary Modern	Video	4 minutes	Color
2004	Let Me Count the Ways, Minus 10, 9, 8, and 7...	Video	20 minutes	Color
2005	End in A New World	HDV	3 minutes	Color
2005	Photography is Easy	Video	5 minutes	Color
2006	Sahara Mojave	HDV	11 minutes	Color
2006	Let Me Count the Ways: Minus 6	HDV	1 minutes	Black-and-white
2006	Data Tent	Multimedia	Installation	Multimedia
2007	As the World Turns	HDV	3 minutes	Color
2007	Sahara Mojave (version 2)	HDV	12 minutes	Color
2007	Minus 9	Multimedia	Installation	Multimedia
2006	The Expiration	Video	2 minutes	Color
2008	Novel City	Video	7 minutes	Color
2009	BOB-BOB	Video	Installation	Color
2009	((((( )))))	HD Video	9 minutes	Color
2010	Photography is Easy (version 2)	Video	6 minutes	Color
2010	Binocular	Video installation	Installation	Color
2010	Golden Eyes	HD Video	3 minutes	Color
2010	Migrating Forms Trailer	HD video loop	1 minutes	Color
2011	Twice Removed	HD video	11 minutes	Color
2012	SONGS One Two Three	HD video	14 minutes	Color
2013	SNAPS: Elephant Pair	HD video	2 minutes	Color
2013	SNAPS: Oil/Air	2K video	2 minutes	Color
2013	LUNA 1905	HD video	5 minutes	Black-and-white
2013	LUNA Snow	HD video	2 minutes	Color
2013	LUNA Heaven	HD video	8 minutes	Color
2013	Peggy and Fred in Hell: The Fold	Digital projection; stacks of CRT monitors	95 minutes	Color; sepia; black-and-white
2013	The Fold	Digital video	2 minutes	Color; black-and-white
2013	LUNA Trance	Video triptych with installation environment	12 minute loop	Color
2013	The Animates: Oil/Air/Water	2K video	7 minutes	Color
2013	Philosophers Walk on the Sublime	Digital video	16 minutes	Color
Ongoing	The Great Invisible	16mm; HD video	90 minutes	Color; production began in 2002
Ongoing	What I Learned of China From The Sky	Multi-screen digital video installation	Installation	Color

== Awards ==
Thornton has received many awards for her film and video work throughout her career, including:

- Iowa Film Festival, Honorable Mention (for X-TRACTS), 1976
- San Francisco Art Institute Film Festival, Honorable Mention (for X-TRACTS), 1980
- Athens International Film Festival, Special Merit Award (for Jennifer, Where Are You?), 1981
- Athens International Film Festival, Special Merit Award (for Adynata), 1984
- Rhode Island Council on the Arts, Grant (for Peggy and Fred in Hell), 1985
- National Endowment for the Arts, Grants: 1981, 1992, 1995
- The Jerome Foundation, Grants: 1985, 1988, 1992
- New York State Council on the Arts, Grants: 1985, 1989
- Art Matters, Inc., Grants, 1987, 1988, 1993
- The Rockefeller Foundation, Fellowships: 1988, 1990, 1997
- New York Foundation for the Arts, Fellowships: 1988, 1999
- The Alpert Awards in the Arts, 1995 (first Media Arts Recipient)
- New England Film and Video Festival, Judges' Special Merit Award (for The Last Time I Saw Ron), 1995
- Three Rivers Arts Festival, First Prize: Best of Show/Video Category (for The Last Time I Saw Ron), 1995
- The Maya Deren Award for Independent Film and Video Artists, 1996
- Hugo Boss Award of the Solomon R. Guggenheim Museum, Nominee, 1998
- Stephen Holden's "Best Films in 1999" (for Another Worldy), New York Times, 2000
- Rainbow Program, LAB Artist Outreach Program, Participating Artist, 2005
- Onion City Film Festival, Second Place (for Let Me Count the Ways Minus 10, 9, 8, 7..., 2005
- Anonymous Was A Woman, Grant, 2008
- Brown University, Humanities Research Fund, 2009
- Film Comment, "Best of the Decade Avant-Garde Films" (for Let Me Count the Ways), 2010
- Jonathan Rosenbaum, "All Time Top 1000 Films", (for Adynata), 2010

== Collections and representation ==
Thorton is represented by the Winkleman Gallery in New York, New York and Unit 17 in Vancouver, Canada and distributed by Elisabeth de Brabant, the DIA Foundation, Video Data Bank, Electronic Arts Intermix, Women Make Movies, New York Film Makers Co-op, Light Cone, and LUX. In addition to numerous private collections, Thornton's pieces are in the collections of the following institutions:

- Smithsonian American Art Museum
- Jeu de paume
- Fundacion La Laboral
- Fundacion Salamancia Ciudad de Cultura
- Museum of Modern Art, Fundacio la Caixa
- Centre Pompidou
- Pacific Film Archive
- Newark Museum
- Arteleku/Donostia-San Sebastian
- Parabola Arts Foundation
- Fundació Antoni Tàpies
- Harvard University
- School of the Art Institute of Chicago
- Ecole Nationale Supieure des Beaux Arts
- Bezalel Academy of Arts and Design
- University of Notre Dame
- Queen's University
- New York University
- Princeton University
- Carnegie Mellon University
- California Institute of the Arts
- University of California, San Diego
- Walker Art Center
