= Donna Uchizono =

American choreographer

- Born: U.S. Army Base, Tokyo, Japan
- Occupations: Choreographer, dancer, performer
- Years active: 1983–present

Donna Uchizono is an American choreographer.

== Life and career ==
Donna Uchizono is an American choreographer and is the artistic director of Donna Uchizono Company based in New York City. A Guggenheim Fellow and United States Artist awardee, Donna Uchizono has received many awards and grants for her work including both National Endowment for the Arts Company Project Grants (8) and Fellowships (3), MAP Fund (4), Alpert Award, "Bessie" New York Dance and Performance Award, Jerome Foundation (3), National Performance Network Commission and Touring support (4) Creative Capital, both National Dance Project Commission (2) and Touring support (2), Dance Magazine Grant, and Metropolitan Life, among many other awards including extensive New York State and New York City sustained funding.

She was born on a US Army base in Tokyo, Japan, and grew up in Southern California. In California she danced with the dance companies of Jeff Slayton and Dancers and Lynn Dally and Dancers. While dancing with Jeff Slayton and Dancers, she received a B.A. in dance from California State University, Long Beach, California. In 1986, Uchizono moved to New York City, where she lives and works.

She was a founding member and serves on the Artist Advisory Board at Danspace Project at St. Mark's Church, where she also served as chair from 1990 to 1995. In 1990 she established the Donna Uchizono Company dedicated to dance performance, where she serves as artistic director.

Donna Uchizono, confirmed by the New York Library for the Performing Arts, has been distinguished as being the first and only American-born choreographer of Asian ancestry in the history of Modern Dance, who has received cumulative national award recognition and toured an eponymous dance company across the US and internationally. She has been a dance advocate in bringing light to the invisibility and perpetual foreigner syndrome that American-born of Asian descent face.

== Honors and awards ==
- 2023, 2022, 2021, 2013, 2012, 2009, 2007, 2005, 2004, 2003, 2002 National Endowment for the Arts
- 2023, 2022, 2021, 2020, 2019, 2018, 2016, 2014 New York State Council for the Arts
- 2023, 2022, 2021, 2020, 2018, 2015, 2014, 2010, 2009 New York City Department of Cultural Affairs
- 2023, 2019 New Music USA
- 2018 Dance Advancement Fund (made possible by the Ford Foundation)
- 2016 United States Artist Award
- 2005 Alpert Award
- 2002, 2004 NEFA's National Dance Project
- 2002 New York Dance and Performance Award
- 2002 Creative Capital Grant
- 1999, 2003, 2004 Rockefeller Foundation MAP Grant
- 1998 John Simon Guggenheim Fellowship
- 1996, 00, 04 New York Foundation for the Arts Choreography Fellowship
- 1995–93 National Endowment for the Arts Choreographer's Fellowship

== Works ==
Selected works include:

- 2018 March Under an Empty reign
- 2016 Sticky Majesty
- 2016 Break
- 2013 Fire Underground
- 2013 Out of Frame
- 2012 excerpt of Seven
- 2011 Revisiting Drinking Ivy
- 2010 longing two
- 2009 50 Miles from Forsyth
- 2008 Badlands
- 2007 Thin Air
- 2006 Leap to Tall
- 2006 Moving Liszt
- 2005 Approaching Green
- 2005 Hug
- 2004 Butterflies from my Hand
- 2002 Low
- 2001 Featherweight
- 2000 On Shaky Ground
- 1999 Invitados
- 1999 Summer Sprinkle
- 1999 Opening
- 1999 State of Heads
- 1998 Catching
- 1998 The Wayne Sisters
- 1998 Teetering High
- 1997 Me Emociono
- 1997 Fly Bye Buenos Aires
- 1997 Falling Upward
- 1996 Sipping Air
- 1995 quietly goes a giant jane
- 1994 Drinking Ivy
- 1994 Iron Wings
- 1994 Angels on Granite
- 1994 Fax Me
- 1993 A Sage Passage
- 1993 Improvisation
- 1993 The Interview
- 1993 Four Play
- 1992 Desiree
- 1992 Flores Para Lorenzo
- 1992 Clandestina
- 1991 The Wayne Brothers
- 1991 it comes in threes
- 1991 Talking Ball
- 1991 Recollection Bruise
- 1990 San Andreas
- 1990 Siren
- 1990 Fault
- 1990 Pelican Dive
- 1989 Accommodations
- 1989 Waving, Not Drowning
- 1989 short tahitian temper
- 1989 Leaning Tall
- 1988 Surfacing
- 1988 Water on the Knee
